= Vincent Sheu =

American physicist and political advisor (born 1990)

- Born: October 1, 1990 (age 35)
- Citizenship: United States
- Education: Saratoga High School
- Alma mater: University of California, Berkeley (BA, MEng); Stanford University (JD, MS)

Vincent Sheu (born October 1, 1990) is an American speedcuber from Saratoga, California known for organizing World Cube Association (WCA) competitions and setting the world record in both the Fewest Moves Challenge (FMC) event and the 2×2×2 single solve. He previously served as the first Chair of the WCA's Regulations Committee with Lucas Garron from 2012 to 2015, directing a complete redrafting of the official competition regulations and guidelines during his tenure. He has received media attention as the subject of several viral images and video clips at various college sporting events.

== Personal life ==
Sheu completed a joint degree at Stanford University. He received a J.D. from Stanford Law School and M.S. in Computer Science from the Stanford School of Engineering in June 2018.

Sheu previously graduated from the University of California, Berkeley with a B.A. in Statistics and Molecular & Cell Biology (’12) and an M.Eng. in Bioengineering (’14). At Berkeley, he served as the President of the Berkeley Cube Club. As part of the University of California's Decal program, he taught the popular courses “Learn To Solve the Rubik’s Cube” (Math 98) and “Speedsolving” (Math 198). Vincent is a retired avid sports blogger with California Golden Blogs.

== Rubik's Cube career ==
Sheu has been an active speedcuber since 2006. He typically uses the CFOP method, a layer-by-layer system popularized by Jessica Fridrich in 1997. In 2011, he tied the existing world record for a 2×2×2 single solve with a time of 0.96 seconds at the Berkeley Winter Cube Competition. During the 2014 US Nationals Competition, he tied the existing world record for the Fewest Moves Competition (FMC), an event that requires participants to solve a 3×3×3 Rubik's Cube in the fewest moves possible, with an average solve of 25 moves among three different solves. At the same competition, he also set the North American record for a single solve in an FMC event with a solve of 22 moves. As a result, he became the 2014 National Champion in the FMC category.

== Media appearances ==
In February 2014, Sheu was filmed at a Haas Pavilion men's college basketball game between rivals California Golden Bears and the Stanford Cardinal as he performed an impromptu Rubik's cube solve behind sportscasters Bill Walton (color commentator) and Dave Pasch (play-by-play announcer), who were commentating at the game. Given his placement at the front of the California student section directly between and behind the announcers, Sheu's cube-solve was immediately visible to audiences watching the game on ESPN2. A clip of the solve went viral as a YouTube video on the internet shortly thereafter.

After the high popularity of his cube solve, Sheu was subsequently placed by ESPN2 producers to solve additional cubes and puzzles behind sportscasters during live broadcasts of California basketball games against the Utah Utes, Utah Valley Wolverines, and Arkansas Razorbacks. He was also featured by Bill Walton in a short ESPN2 segment about his participation at Rubik's Cube competitions and the Berkeley college experience during the California Golden Bears – Arizona Wildcats game three weeks later.

Following these events, Sheu was featured in a promotional video on student life by the University of California, Berkeley that aired on Pac-12 Networks.

Sheu was one of several speedcubers to appear in "Will We Become God?," Episode 8, Season 5 of Through the Wormhole, an American science documentary television series by actor Morgan Freeman. The episode aired on July 9, 2014.

During a college basketball game between the Stanford Cardinal and University of California – Los Angeles Bruins on February 5, 2014, Sheu was again the subject of internet and media attention. As Bill Walton commented the Pac-12 game on ESPN2, Sheu was filmed with a fellow student wearing "Stanford Law School" apparel and studying during the first half of the game as they sat in the student section with binders, textbooks, and casebooks. Although the film clip was later determined to have been spliced in shortly before the game actually began, the image proceeded to go viral and reached "meme" status on Reddit, Twitter, Facebook, and AboveTheLaw.com, prompting humorous discussion about the difficult academic workload of first year law students.

Sheu was one of several speedcubers to make a cameo in Netflix's documentary, The Speed Cubers, which was released on July 29, 2020.

== See also ==
- Tyson Mao
- Anthony Michael Brooks
- Eric Limeback
- Macky Makisumi
- Lars Petrus
- Feliks Zemdegs
- Mats Valk
- Rowe Hessler
