= 2007 Rubik's Cube World Championship =

Mechanical puzzle solving contest

Tournament information
- Sport: Speedcubing
- Location: Budapest, Hungary
- Date: 5–7 October 2007
- Host: Hungary
- Venue: Novotel Budapest Congress

Final positions
- 1st runner-up: Andrew Kang
- 2nd runner-up: Mitsuki Gunji

Final champion
- Yu Nakajima

The 2007 Rubik's Cube World Championship was a speedcubing competition held in Budapest from November 5–7, 2007. It was attended by 214 athletes from 32 countries, including 65 representatives of the host country. Being the fourth edition, it was the first time that it was held in the same city as the previous one—Budapest hosted the first world championship in this sport in 1982—and was timed to coincide with the 25th anniversary of that event.

Athletes competed in 17 disciplines. Two disciplines were added compared to the previous championship. Pyraminx (Meffert's Pyramid) had previously been featured at the 2003 World Championships, but was not included in the 2005 competition program due to an omission in the codification of the speedcubing rules. Multi-blind —solving several Rubik's cubes blindfolded against the clock—was an entirely new discipline.

The tournament generated considerable media interest from around the world. Journalists and sports representatives from various countries admired the achievements of their athletes, who solved the puzzles in mere seconds, and described the competition as a "battle for the Rubik's crown" – analogous to the chess crown. However, the championship was not without its share of cheating: in 2008, it was discovered that one athlete had peeked out from under his blindfold during a blindfolded attempt; his results were annulled.

== Organization ==
The Budapest Congress Centre (Novotel Budapest Congress) was chosen as the venue for the championship . The competition area consisted of three rooms: a large and small theatre stage and a hall for long events. Participant registration, photo sessions, and souvenir sales took place in the congress centre's "market area". The awards ceremony and closing ceremony for the championship were held on the main stage. The competitions in the main hall were broadcast on screens installed in the common areas of the facility.

The event's guest of honor was inventor Ernő Rubik, who had been awarded the Kossuth Prize six months before the championship. He praised the organization of the competition, which proceeded smoothly, and was pleased that many young people were competing in this intellectual sport.

Unlike the previous championship, puzzles from any manufacturer were allowed, except for illegal copies and counterfeits of the Rubik's brand. There was concern that Seven Towns , the copyright holder of the Rubik's brand, would ban the use of puzzles from other manufacturers at the championship, but under pressure from the WCA, it dropped its claims, and since May 2007, the use of products from any brand has been permitted at all competitions.

The total prize fund for the championship was €20,000, with the highest prize—€5,000—going to the champion in the 3x3x3 cube discipline. In addition, all winners received a trophy (medal) and a certificate. As in 2005, winners in the Megaminx, Pyraminx, Rubik's Clock, Square-1, Rubik's Magic, and Master Magic disciplines did not receive cash prizes.

== Regulation ==
The competition was held according to the WCA rules as of February 1, 2007. By this time, they had already established their key principles and acquired their modern structure. The main differences from the previous world championship were new disciplines, the acceptance of puzzles of any brand, and the introduction of a modern method for determining the qualifying result (Ao5 – the truncated average of 5 attempts) in the finals of the disciplines 4x4x4, 5x5x5, 3x3x3 one-handed, Rubik's Clock, and Square-1.

=== Qualification ===
To qualify for the World Championship, an athlete must have achieved a qualifying result in the previous official competition:

- 2x2x2 cube, pyraminx, Rubik's clock, Rubik's magic, master magic - 30 seconds;
- 3x3x3 cube with one hand - 1:30 minutes;
- squire-1 - 2 minutes;
- cube 3x3x3, cube 4x4x4 - 2:30 minutes;
- 5x5x5 cube, megaminx, 3x3x3 cube with legs - 4 minutes;
- 3x3x3 cube blindfold - 10 minutes;
- 4x4x4 cube blindfold - 45 minutes;
- 5x5x5 cube blindfold - 90 minutes;
- multi-blind, 3x3x3 cube for the number of moves - no selection.

Moreover, if an athlete wishing to compete in the 3x3x3, 4x4x4, 5x5x5, 3x3x3 blindfold or 3x3x3 one-handed assembly was not in the top 50 of the WCA world ranking at the time of registration, he had to take part in the qualification round of the competition.

=== Accounting for the results ===
All results were entered into the WCA database. However, in 2008, the ranking order of results in the multi-blind discipline was revised, and an additional section, "multi-blind under old rules," was created in the database, into which the results of all 2007 competitions in this discipline were transferred. Of the 27 participants in the World Championship who competed in multi-blind, only 13 were entered into the database section under the modern rules of this discipline, since the results of the remaining athletes in this discipline amounted to DNF.

== Results ==
=== 3x3x3 Cube ===
Place	Name	Average	Status	Country	Attempt 1	Attempt 2	Attempt 3	Attempt 4	Attempt 5
Average of 5
1	Yu Nakajima	12.46	NR	Japan	11.50	13.43	14.38	12.16	11.78
2	Andrew Kang	13.05	NAR	United States	15.33	15.18	11.90	10.88	12.06
3	Mitsuki Gunji	13.05		Japan	12.66	16.50	12.41	12.61	13.88

NAR = North American Record
NR = National Record

=== Blind Assembly Cheating ===
In February 2008, an announcement was made on the official forum of the World Cube Federation that Hungarian athlete Mátyás Kuti had cheated during his participation in a blindfold cube competition. Such suspicions had previously been unofficially voiced by some speedcubers due to his outstanding results (for example, he set a world record at the 2007 championship, and in various competitions he had successfully solved 77 cubes without a single DNF), but there was no confirmation of this. At the 2008 Belgian Open, an additional rule was introduced: during blindfolded solves, the judge holds a sheet of paper between the athlete's face and the puzzle; Mátyás was found to have difficulty under these conditions. An investigation was launched, and during the analysis of video recordings, it was noticed that he was apparently peeking from under his blindfold. The most compelling evidence came when he made a mistake while solving the puzzle, but instead of reversing the moves, he started solving it from scratch and successfully solved it, which would have been impossible during a real blindfolded attempt. Mátyás Kuti was disqualified for three years and subsequently did not participate in speedcubing competitions, and all his results in 3x3x3 blindfold, 4x4x4 blindfold, 5x5x5 blindfold, and multi-blind were annulled and considered a DNF.

This incident led to the addition of B4c to the speedcubing rules in 2008, which required that, in addition to the blindfold, an opaque object must be placed between the athlete's face and the puzzle during assembly, or the puzzle must be located out of the athlete's line of sight (e.g., behind their back).
