= 2003 Rubik's Cube World Championship =

Mechanical puzzle solving contest

Tournament information
- Sport: Speedcubing
- Location: Toronto, Canada
- Date: 23–24 August 2003
- Host: Canada
- Venue: Ontario Science Centre

Final positions
- 1st runner-up: Jessica Fridrich
- 2nd runner-up: David Wesley

Final champion
- Dan Knights

The 2003 Speedcubing World Championship was a speedcubing competition held in Toronto on August 23–24, 2003. 88 athletes from various countries (including seven women) competed in 14 disciplines. The championship was organized by a group of like-minded individuals via the internet. The rationale for holding this event, 21 years after the previous World Championship, was the gradual rise of interest in mechanical puzzles after their relative decline in previous years. The next world championship was held in 2005 in Florida, United States, with some differences, the most notable being the addition of the 3x3x3 'With Feet' event.

As the second speedcubing world competition and the first in the 21st century, this championship generated considerable public interest, was widely covered by the media, and contributed to the growth of the sport's popularity. The following year, the tournament organizers created the World Cube Association, some of whose rules formed the basis for some of the regulations of the second world championship.

Binghamton University professor Jessica Fridrich, who developed and published a method for solving the Rubik's Cube in 1997, took part in the championship. She took second place in the 3x3x3 category. It is noteworthy that both the winner and many other competitors used the same method, which was already quite well known.

== Organization ==
In 1999, Chris Hardwick of Raleigh, North Carolina, founded the "Speedsolvingrubikscube" community on Yahoo Groups, where speedcubers could share their achievements..Ron van Bruchem launched the website speedcubing.com with his friend Ton Dennenbroek, an avid puzzle collector. Since speedcubers were located all over the world, they wanted to organize a competition where they could all meet. In 2003, under the guidance of Dan Gosbee, they organized the Rubik's Cube World Championship in Toronto.

The championship was held at the Ontario Science Centre over two days. The first day included the qualifying rounds, the second day included the finals, and the only rounds in the single-stage events. The press noted that the atmosphere at the competition was very positive and the overall level of organization was quite good. The total prize fund for the competition was approximately 18,000 Canadian dollars , with the winner of the 3x3x3 cube event receiving 5,000 CAD. In addition, all participants received souvenirs.

== Regulations ==
The regulations of the second World Championship, although they served as the basis for the subsequently adopted WCA Regulations, had some differences.

- In the 3x3x3 discipline, the competition was held in three stages. All registered athletes participated in the first round, each making three attempts, with the best time counting. The 32 best participants advanced to the second round, and its regulations were similar to the first. The top 8 participants from the second round advanced to the finals, each making 5 attempts, with the average truncated time counting.
- In the 4x4x4 and 5x5x5 disciplines, the competition was held in 2 stages. Participants made 3 attempts, and the arithmetic mean time was counted. The top three athletes from the qualifying round advanced to the final. The final regulations were similar.
- In the disciplines “magic” and “master magic” the participants made 3 attempts, the best time was counted.
- In the “3×3×3 with one hand” discipline, participants made 2 attempts, the best time was counted.
- In all other disciplines, participants made one attempt.

Thus, in many disciplines, with the exception of the Rubik's Cube itself, there was a divergence from the rules of the sport, which were codified in August 2004 as the WCA Regulations and were subsequently refined. This resulted in the results of this competition being only partially counted, namely:

- The results of all individual assemblies were counted as single attempts. Specifically, world, continental, and national records for single attempts were recorded.
- The results of the 4x4x4 and 5x5x5 disciplines in the qualifying form (average time) were also counted, since the difference between the 2003 World Championship regulations and the adopted rules was considered non-critical (namely: at the 2003 World Championships, the average time was calculated from three completed assemblies, while the WCA regulations require that 5 assemblies be completed, the shortest and longest times be discarded, and the average be calculated from the three remaining results).

The most notable difference in the 2005 event would be the 'With Feet' event, where the contestant has to solve it with their feet. The champion would be Will Arnold who was born with a birth defect, limiting the use of his arms.

== Results ==
=== 3x3x3 Cube ===
Place	Name	Average	Status	Country	Attempt 1	Attempt 2	Attempt 3	Attempt 4	Attempt 5
Average of 5
1	Dan Knights	20.00	WR	USA	21.13	19.93	18.95	22.07	18.76
2	Jessica Fridrich	20.48		USA	27.53	22.22	17.33	17.12	21.88
3	David Wesley	20.96	ER	Sweden	24.87	21.82	19.81	19.84	21.22
4	Lars Vandenbergh	21.54	NR	Belgium	21.42	19.27	21.49	22.19	21.70
5	Jess Bonde	21.68	NR	Denmark	20.34	21.29	23.42	25.06	19.21
6	David Allen	21.92		USA	22.13	17.95	27.67	24.06	19.56
7	Gene Means	22.10		USA	29.28	20.92	21.48	23.88	20.93
8	Ron van Bruchem	22.92	NR	Netherlands	25.97	24.46	24.71	19.58	19.46

=== 4x4x4 Cube ===
Place	Name	Average	Status	Country	Attempt 1	Attempt 2	Attempt 3
Average of 3
1	Masayuki Akimoto	1:36.98		Japan	1:43.40	1:27.06	1:40.49
2	David Wesley	1:45.88		Sweden	1:57.47	1:32.46	1:47.72
3	Ron van Bruchem	1:57.75		Netherlands	1:42.95	2:00.83	2:09.48

=== 5x5x5 Cube ===
Place	Name	Average	Status	Country	Attempt 1	Attempt 2	Attempt 3
Average of 3
1	Masayuki Akimoto (秋元正行)	2:50.45	WR	Japan	2:56.76	2:47.62	2:46.96
2	David Wesley	2:56.29		Sweden	3:07.69	3:01.56	2:39.62
3	Grant Tregay	3:41.96		USA	3:55.13	3:40.22	3:30.52

=== 3x3x3 Blindfolded ===
Place	Name	Attempt	Status	Country
Best of 1
1	Dror Vomberg	3:56.00	WR	Israel
2	Shotaro Makisumi (牧角章太郎)	6:35.00	AsR	Japan
3	Dan Knights	DNF		USA

=== 3x3x3 Fewest Moves ===
Place	Name	Attempt	Status	Country
Best of 1
1	Mirek Goljan	29 Moves	WR	Czechia
2	David Barr	36 Moves	NAR	USA

=== 3x3x3 One Handed ===
Place	Name	Best Attempt	Status	Country	Attempt 1	Attempt 2
Best of 2
1	Chris Hardwick	44.98	WR	USA	44.98	1:00.45
2	Michael Atkinson	54.04		USA	54.04	1:20.52
3	Grant Tregay	1:02.05		USA	1:36.99	1:02.05
4	David Wesley	1:10.67	ER	Sweden	2:11.44	1:10.67
5	Lars Petrus	1:14.53		Sweden	1:23.53	1:14.53
6	Joe Allen	1:14.58		USA	1:14.58	2:47.69
7	David Allen	1:19.04		USA	1:19.04	DNF
8	Heath Litton	1:20.19		USA	2:01.24	1:20.19
9	Brent Morgan	1:21.35		USA	1:56.59	1:21.35
10	Peter Babcock	1:32.88		USA	2:27.77	1:32.88
11	Kenneth Brandon	2:03.45		USA	2:03.45	2:13.89
12	Michiel van der Blonk	2:06.23	NR	Netherlands	3:12.15	2:06.23

=== Clock ===
Place	Name	Attempt	Status	Country
Best of 1
1	Jaap Scherphuis	38.97	WR	Netherlands
2	Jasmine Lee	42.00	OcR	Australia
3	Lars Vandenbergh	45.52	NR	Belgium
4	Michael Powers	54.20	NAR	USA
5	Ron van Bruchem	1:33.74		Netherlands
6	Jeff Goetz	2:01.06		USA

=== Megaminx ===
Place	Name	Attempt	Status	Country
Best of 1
1	Grant Tregay	2:12.82	WR	USA
2	Richard Patterson	4:12.38		USA
3	Ron van Bruchem	4:26.56	ER	Netherlands
4	Jake Rueth	4:42.74		USA
5	Betty Tregay	5:12.64		USA

=== Pyraminx ===
Place	Name	Attempt	Status	Country
Best of 1
1	Andy Bellenir	14.09	WR	USA
2	Jake Rueth	19.85		USA
3	Jeff Goetz	29.50		USA
4	Richard Patterson	31.10		USA
5	Jaap Scherphuis	31.20	ER	Netherlands
6	Dan Harris	35.02	NR	United Kingdom

=== Square-1 ===
Place	Name	Attempt	Status	Country
Best of 1
1	Lars Vandenbergh	41.80	WR	Belgium
2	Jeff Goetz	1:42.12	NAR	USA
3	Ron van Bruchem	2:14.28	NR	Netherlands
4	Paul Attar	2:19.40	NR	Canada

=== 4x4x4 Blindfolded ===
Place	Name	Attempt	Status	Country
Best of 1
1	Dror Vomberg	22:35.00	WR	Israel

=== 5x5x5 Blindfolded ===
Place	Name	Attempt	Status	Country
Best of 1
1	Dror Vomberg	DNF	WR	Israel

=== Magic ===
Place	Name	Best Attempt	Status	Country	Attempt 1	Attempt 2	Attempt 3
Best of 3
1	Jaap Scherphuis	3.06	WR	Netherlands	5.34	3.19	3.06
2	Jake Rueth	3.27	NAR	USA	3.27	4.71	4.30
3	Jon Morris	4.51		USA	5.33	4.53	4.51
4	Jason Hildebrand	5.18		USA	5.73	9.23	5.18
5	Ron van Bruchem	5.83		Netherlands	5.83	6.07	14.05
6	Michiel van der Blonk	6.65		Netherlands	9.69	7.85	6.65

=== Master Magic ===
Place	Name	Best Attempt	Status	Country	Attempt 1	Attempt 2	Attempt 3
Best of 3
1	Jaap Scherphuis	8.22	WR	Netherlands	9.91	13.92	8.22
2	Kevin Brandon	8.45	NAR	USA	8.45	8.47	8.62
3	Kenneth Brandon	9.34		USA	13.02	10.78	9.34
4	Jake Rueth	10.85		USA	16.72	21.21	10.85
5	Jon Morris	11.09		USA	22.97	11.09	11.93

WR = World Record

ER = European Record

AsR = Asian Record

NAR = North American Record

NR = National Record

DNF = Did Not Finish

=== World records ===
Since the Toronto World Championships were the first official (WCA-recognized and database-listed) competitions for all disciplines except the 3x3x3 cube, the best results achieved at those championships were awarded world record status. It's possible that faster solves could have been achieved at non-WCA-recognized competitions in these disciplines. In the "3x3x3 Cube - Best Attempt" and "4x4x4 Cube - Average" categories, two world records were set each. This is because the record set in the qualifying round was broken in the final the following day. According to the speedcubing rule 9i2, in such cases both records are recorded.

- 3x3x3 Cube: Best attempt: (United States) Dan Knights 16.71 and (Denmark) Jess Bonde 16.53; Average: (United States) Dan Knights 20.00
- 4x4x4 Cube: Best Run: (Japan) Masayuki Akimoto 1:20.16; Average: (Sweden) David Wesley 1:30.57
- 5x5x5 Cube: Best Run: (Sweden) David Wesley 2:19.69; Average: (Sweden) David Wesley 2:50.68 and (Japan) Masayuki Akimoto 2:50.45
- 3x3x3 Blindfold Cube: Best attempt – (Israel) Dror Fomberg 3:56.00
- 4x4x4 Blindfold Cube: Best Attempt – (Israel) Dror Fomberg 22:35.00
- 3x3x3 Cube by Moves: (Czech Republic) Mirek Goljan 29 Moves
- One-Handed 3x3x3 Cube: Best Attempt – Chris Hardwick 44.98 (United States) Chris Hardwick
- Rubik's Clock: Best Attempt – (Netherlands) Jaap Scherpius 38.97
- Pyraminx: Best attempt - (United States) Andy Bellenier 14.09
- Megaminx: Best Run: (United States) Grant Tregay 2:12.82
- Square 1: Best attempt – (Belgium) Lars Vanderberg 41.80
- Rubik's Magic: Best Attempt – (Netherlands) Jaap Scherpius 3.06
- Master Magic: Best Attempt – (Netherlands) Jaap Scherpius 8.22
