= CFOP method =

Method in speedcubing

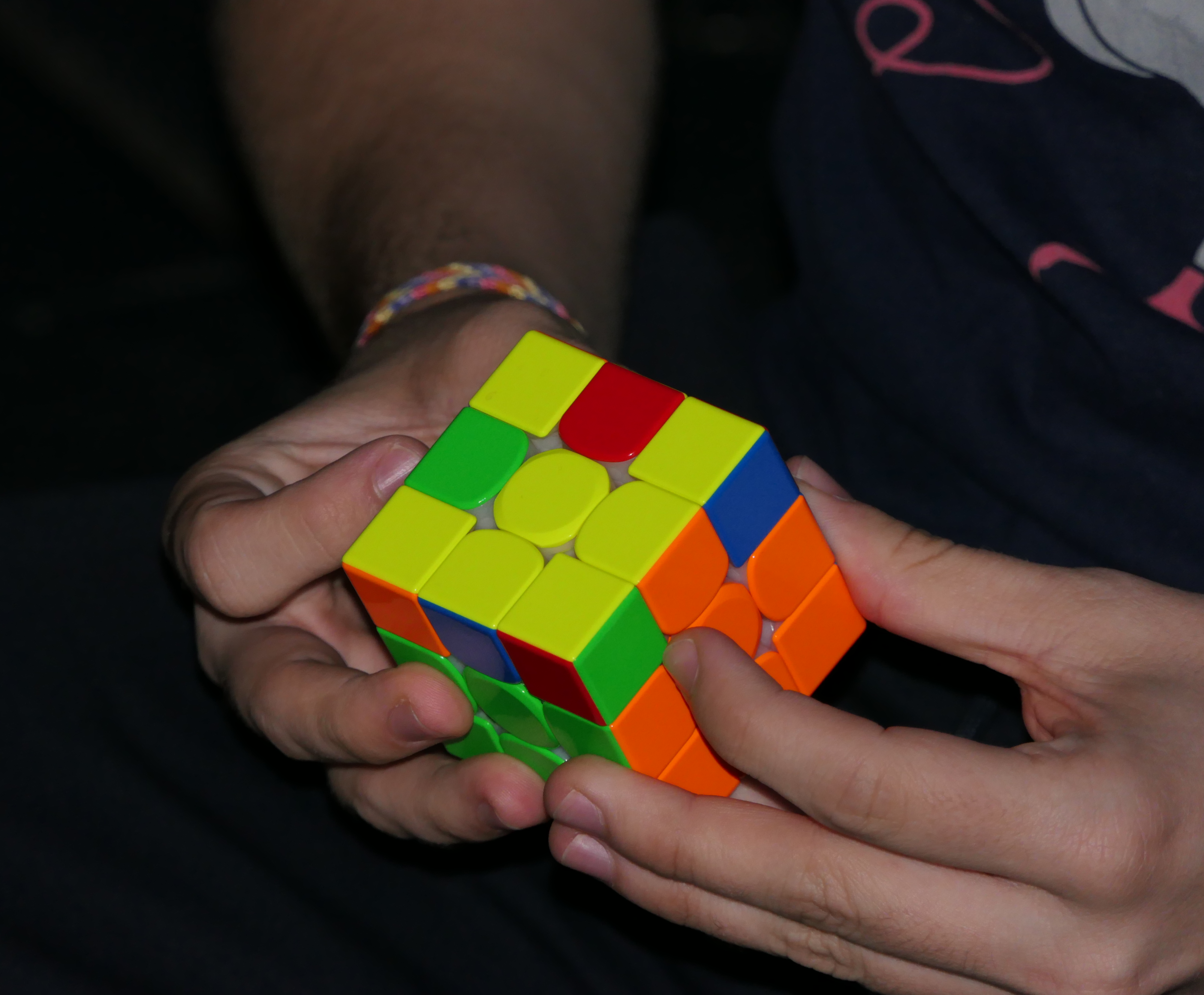
Cube during the OLL step of the CFOP method.

The CFOP method, also known as the Fridrich method, is one of the most widely used methods for speedsolving the 3×3×3 Rubik's Cube. CFOP stands for Cross, First Two Layers (F2L), Orientation of the Last Layer (OLL), and Permutation of the Last Layer (PLL). Alongside the Roux and ZZ methods, it is regarded as one of the fastest and most popular methods used in competitive speedcubing. The method was first developed in the early 1980s through the combined innovations of several speedcubers. Jessica Fridrich, a Czech speedcuber after whom the method is commonly named, is generally credited with popularizing it after publishing her approach online in 1997.

The method begins by solving a cross, typically on the bottom face of the cube, before solving the first two layers simultaneously (F2L). The final layer is then completed in two stages: first by orienting its pieces (OLL) and then by permuting them into their correct positions (PLL). Learning the full method requires memorizing 119 algorithms: 41 for F2L, 57 for full OLL, and 21 for full PLL. Additional algorithm sets, such as ZBLL (Zborowski–Bruchem Last Layer) with 493 algorithms(which include 21 PLLs) and COLL (Corners of the Last Layer) with 42 algorithms, can also be learned to further improve solving efficiency.

F2L can be optimized using advanced F2L, which employs additional algorithms to reduce cube rotations and regrips. Advanced F2L contains significantly more algorithms than the standard 41 cases, and many top speedcubers memorize hundreds of algorithms for this step, including multiple algorithms for the same case.

Alternatively, the F2L step can be solved using intuitive F2L, in which the solver relies on general solving principles rather than memorized algorithms, trading efficiency for accessibility. Combined with beginner versions of OLL and PLL that divide each stage into two parts (requiring 10 algorithms for OLL and 6 for PLL), the CFOP method can be learned with as few as 16 algorithms.

== History ==
Basic layer-by-layer (LBL) methods were among the first to arise during the early 1980s craze, such as James Nourse's The Simple Solution to Rubik's Cube, which proposed the use of a cross, and worked its way down. David Singmaster published a faster layer-based solution in 1980.

The major innovation of CFOP over the simpler LBL methods is its use of F2L, which solves the first two layers simultaneously by solving top-corners and vertical edges together after the Cross is established. Guus Razoux Schultz used this method as part of his CFCE method during the 1982 World Rubik's Cube Championship, but he did not invent this F2L method. Jessica Fridrich, also competing at this championship, was then using an LBL method. The first official publication of CFOP was done by Anneke Treep and Kurt Dockhorn in 1981 in the Netherlands, based on the F2L-pairing idea of the Dutch professor René Schoof.

Another difference between the CFOP method over Nourse's simple solution is that it orients the Last Layer first, and then positions the pieces. In the simple solution, the pieces are positioned first, and then oriented.

The last layer steps OLL (orient last layer) and PLL (position last layer) involve first orienting the last layer pieces, then permuting them into their correct positions. This was first published in Dutch by Hans Dockhorn and Anneke Treep in 1981. Jessica Fridrich developed OLL-PLL parallel in the Czech Republic.

Fridrich switched to F2L later in 1982 after she got the idea from Guus Razoux Schultz. Her main contribution to the method was developing the OLL and PLL algorithms, which together allowed any last layer position to be solved with two algorithms and was significantly faster than the previous last layer systems.

CFOP, with small tweaks, is by far the most popular method that top cubers use. Users include Mats Valk, Feliks Zemdegs, Yiheng Wang, Max Park, and many more.

However, top solvers like Xuanyi Geng (耿暄一) and Tymon Kolasiński are switching to the ZB (Zborowski-Bruchem) method, which is a modification of the CFOP method. On the last F2L pair (there are 4), a solver uses one of 125 algorithms to not only solve the last pair, but also orient the top layer edges, making a cross appear on top. This step is called ZBLS (ZB Last Slot). Then, instead of using OLL and PLL, they use a single algorithm that is part of ZBLL (ZB Last Layer), out of 493 algorithms, to solve the cube. This method is very hard to learn and maintain, and it also takes longer to recognize a case. It is possible to see a visible pause before the last step of professional solvers while they are recognizing a case.

== Method ==
Cross solved (White on bottom)

=== Inspection ===
At WCA competitions, speedcubers are given 15 seconds to inspect the cube, meaning looking at it from any angle without performing any moves.

During inspection, speedcubers, usually beginner to intermediate cubers, try to come up with a solution for just the cross. More advanced cubers can also come up with a solution to solve their first F2L pair while simultaneously solving the cross ("Cross + 1" or "XCross", if cross and the first F2L pair are solved at the same time).

=== Cross ===
This first stage involves solving four edges with a common color to a center piece of that common color, creating a cross shape. Most beginner methods solve the cross by first putting the white edge pieces around the yellow center on the top, then matching them with the same-colored center, and finally moving them down to match them with the white center. Most CFOP cubers, however, keep the cross side facing down while immediately inserting the edges rather than putting them on the opposite side. A way speedcubers avoid rotations is by solving the edge pieces relative to each other. As an example, if we picked yellow as the cross, instead of making sure we put the blue-yellow edge correctly, putting the yellow-green edge on the top layer, moving it to its unique center and then solving it, instead you solve the blue-yellow edge on the yellow side regardless of the adjacent center, move yellow-green edge to the opposite side from the blue and then move the cross side to make the edges match their unique center.

The cross is usually solved intuitively, although some techniques, such as replacement and edge orientation, are used. The white cross is most commonly used for demonstration and by beginner and intermediate speedsolvers, while some more advanced speedcubers can use any of the six colors to form the cross (usually, they choose the color that requires the fewest/easiest moves), a practice known as color neutrality. The cross can always be solved in 8 moves or fewer.

First Two Layers (F2L) solved

=== First Two Layers (F2L) ===
While the beginner methods continues by solving the four corners of the first layer and then matching the corresponding vertical edges to the corners to solve the second layer, the CFOP method solves each corner along with its corresponding vertical edge at the same time. There are 167 unique cases to solve any cross-colored corner and its matching edge into what is called a slot: the edge between the 2 non cross-colored center piece, of the targeted corner-edge pair to solve, and the centers' shared cross-sided corner.

Advanced speedcubers commonly try to solve multiple pairs at once into their corresponding slot, a common method for this is keyhole, in which a speedcuber spots a solved edge, then moves the cross side appropriately and then inserts a corner(or vice versa).

Another advanced type of keyhole is known as pseudoslotting, usually involving a solved edge and a solved corner, and then moving the cross side in a direction dependent on the case, and finally creating a pair of the 2 solved pieces and then finishing by inserting the pair to make the edge match its centers and reverting the cross side moves performed at the beginning.

Since F2L is the longest stage of the CFOP method, cubers use a technique called look-ahead. Look-ahead is a simple concept that requires a lot of practice, and consists of finding 2 unsolved pairs, and while solving one, a speedcuber tracks the other unsolved pair, and when solving that other pair, they find another pair to track, and repeat this until F2L is over, to not have to pause in between pairs.

=== Prediction ===
Prediction is used in all speedsolving methods. Prediction is a technique in which part of the solve is predicted during inspection, enabling the solver to turn at high speeds due to not needing to lookahead or 'figure out things' during the solve. In CFOP, cubers usually predict the cross, Cross+1, or an X-Cross. High Level solvers predict more into the solve. i.e. more than one pair.

Orientation of the Last Layer (OLL) complete

=== Orient Last Layer (OLL) ===
==== Full OLL ====
OLL or Orientation of the Last Layer is the third step of the CFOP method, which aims to orient (same color facing up) the top layer of the 3×3. This step is fully algorithmic. Doing this in one step is called Full OLL. There are 58 possible combinations of piece orientations, so once again ignoring the solved case, this stage involves learning a total of 57 algorithms. Learning this stage in full is typically the last step chosen in learning CFOP, due to the large number of algorithms.

==== Two-look OLL ====
A simpler version, called two-look OLL, orients the top layer in two stages: Edge Orientation (EO) orients the edges first to produce a cross, then uses a second algorithm for Corner Orientation (CO). This reduces the 57 algorithms down to 3 for EO and 7 for CO, totalling 10. EO commonly begins by teaching only algorithms for two of the three possible cases (Line and L) because the last case (Dot) can be split up into performing the other two algorithms consecutively.

==== Minimizing algorithms learnt ====
This step can be made even more beginner friendly by dividing it into multiple smaller steps, which require learning fewer algorithms. This would be at the cost of more “looks” at the cube to determine which algorithm is needed to solve the current sub-step, slowing down the solver, but can be used as a stepping stone into two-look OLL. For example, here is one way OLL can be learnt in just two algorithms, by fully breaking down EO and CO.

EO: Note the following: Performing the Line algorithm (used to create a cross from the center piece end two edge pieces oriented in a line) on a Dot case (none of the edge pieces are oriented correctly) will yield an L case (the center piece and two neighboring edge pieces are oriented correctly). Doing the same on an L case (in a correct orientation) will yield a Line case, which can then be solved. With this knowledge, all EO cases can be solved in repetitions of only one algorithm.

CO: Note that executing the Sune algorithm on an Antisune case (again in the correct rotation) will yield a Sune case. Furthermore, any non (Sune/Antisune) case can be transformed into a Sune/Antisune case by executing a Sune algorithm at a correct orientation. So this step also only needs only one algorithm.

This method above, while only requiring knowledge of two algorithms, would constitute a “6-look OLL”, since at worst the solver needs to identify a case 6 different times, which is highly impractical. However, these minimal-algorithm methods are a very beginner-friendly way to introduce beginners into more advanced methods, and can easily be built upon by learning more algorithms at the solver's own pace.

=== Permute Last Layer (PLL) ===
The final stage involves moving the pieces of the top layer while preserving their orientation. There are a total of 21 algorithms for this stage. They are distinguished by letter names, often based on what they look like with arrows representing what pieces are swapped around (e.g., A-perm, F-perm, T-perm, etc.). Two-look PLL solves the corners first, followed by the edges, and requires learning just six algorithms of the full PLL set. The most common subset uses the T-perm and Y-perm to solve corners, then the U-perm (in clockwise and counter-clockwise variants), H-perm and Z-perm for edges. However, as corners are solved first in two-look, the relative position of edges is unimportant, and so algorithms that permute both corners and edges can be used to solve corners. The J, T, F, and R-perms are all valid substitutes for the A-perm, while the N, V and Y-perm can do the same job as the E-perm. Even fewer algorithms can be used to solve PLL (as few as two, such as the A-perm and U-perm) at the expense of having to repeat these algorithms to solve other cases, with additional "looks" to identify the next step.

=== Types of Crosses ===
The standard cross consists of four edge pieces connected to their corresponding centers. Several variations of the cross are also used.

X-Cross: An X-Cross is a cross with an additional F2L pair inserted simultaneously. An XX-Cross (pronounced "Double X-Cross") consists of a cross with two F2L pairs inserted. Terms such as XXX-Cross and XXXX-Cross (pronounced "Triple X-Cross" and "Quadruple X-Cross", respectively) are also used.

Cross+1: Cross+1 is similar to an X-Cross but differs in that the additional F2L pair is inserted after the cross has been completed, rather than simultaneously with it.

Cross−1: Cross−1 (pronounced "Cross minus one") leaves one cross edge unsolved, allowing the solver to partially use the M slice during F2L. This can reduce rotations and improve F2L efficiency. A disadvantage is that inserting the remaining cross edge after F2L is generally slower. However, the final cross edge can be inserted in a way that forces specific last-layer cases. This technique is rarely used.

=== Skipped stages ===
Depending on the initial state of the cube and the exact moves made in previous stages, it is possible to complete one stage in such a way that the next stage is also already complete. This is known as a skip, commonly referred to specifically by the stage that isn't required in the solve. A PLL skip is the most common, occurring (when "unforced") approximately 1 in 72 solves, followed by an OLL skip with a 1 in 216 chance to occur. A combination of the two, a full last layer skip, occurs approximately once in 15,552 solves. The Cross and F2L stages of a competition-legal scramble are almost certainly not skippable, though a scramble may present the solver with "free" cross pieces or F2L pairs that are already solved or matched. As speedsolving time is closely related to the number of moves required, any opportunity to make fewer moves presents a significant advantage to the solver. Many speedsolvers have the ability, falling under the general skillset of "lookahead", to identify the likely permutation they will see for the next stage based on the progress of the current stage, and they can vary their solution to avoid permutations that require more moves or an algorithm they are slower to perform. This same ability can allow the solver, in specific known scenarios, to "force" a stage skip with a particular sequence of moves to solve the remainder of the current stage; for instance, by recognizing a particular OLL permutation and performing a specific OLL algorithm, the solver can simultaneously solve PLL, effectively obtaining a PLL skip.

There also exist many advanced extension algorithm sets to be used alongside CFOP, such as COLL, Winter Variation, VLS, ZBLL, and more. However, it is not necessary to learn them in order to solve the cube or to use the CFOP method. These sets usually have a large numbers of algorithms; ZBLL has a total of 472 of them. Therefore, most solvers do not learn these sets and instead focus on improving their skills within regular CFOP.

== Competition use ==
CFOP is the predominant method used in competitive speedcubing and is employed by many of the world's fastest speedcubers, including Max Park, Feliks Zemdegs, and Yiheng Wang. Its emphasis on algorithms, pattern recognition, and muscle memory enables fast and consistent solves. Although methods such as Roux, Petrus, and ZZ remain competitive, the majority of top-ranked World Cube Association (WCA) competitors use CFOP. Some also incorporate advanced techniques, such as the ZB method, to improve last-layer efficiency.
