= Rowe Hessler =

American speedcuber (born 1991)

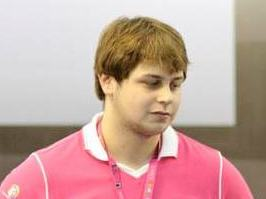
- Hessler in 2011
- Born: February 27, 1991 (age 34); Long Island, New York, U.S.
- Years active: 2007–present
- Known for: Rubik's Cube speedsolving

Rowe Hessler (born February 27, 1991) is an American speedcuber. He is a two-time former U.S. Champion and was runner-up in the 3×3×3 event at the 2011 World Championship. He held the world record for both the single and average of the 2×2×2 event in 2009. Between April and October 2025, he held the world record in 3×3×3 multi-blindfolded with 63/66 cubes solved, totaling 60 points. Hessler held the North American record for the average of five 3×3×3 solves from 2009 to 2014, improving the record from 11.11 to 8.27 seconds.

== Career ==
Hessler began competing in official World Cube Association (WCA) events in 2007. At the 2009 World Championship, he won the 2×2×2 event with an average of 3.28 seconds and secured third place in the 3×3×3 one-handed event with an average of 20.02. In 2010, he set the North American record for a single 3×3×3 solve with a time of 6.94 seconds.

In the 2011 World Championship held in Bangkok, Hessler achieved a 9.56-second solve to finish as the runner-up in the 3×3×3 event. Between 2009 and 2014, he consistently lowered the North American average record for five 3×3×3 solves, culminating in an 8.27-second average at the 2011 Bridgewater Open.

In December 2015, Hessler attempted to break the Guinness World Record for most Rubik’s Cubes solved in 24 hours at Stony Brook University, drawing support from students and faculty.

Beyond the standard events, Hessler is recognized for his blindfolded solving skills. His 3×3×3 multi-blind personal record of 63/66 cubes ranked as the world record between April and October 2025, beating Graham Siggins' 62/65, but then beaten by Graham Siggins' 63/65. He has ranked within the top 50 globally in 3×3×3, 4×4×4, and 5×5×5 blindfolded events. In December 2024, Hessler participated in a speedcubing exhibition at a memory-focused event held at a Natick assisted living facility, showcasing the cognitive demands of multi-blind solving.

== World Championship podiums ==
Event	Ranking	Result	Competition
3×3×3	2nd	9.56s	World Rubik's Cube Championship 2011
2×2×2	1st	3.28s	World Rubik's Cube Championship 2009
3×3×3 one-handed	3rd	20.02s	World Rubik's Cube Championship 2009

== Continental Championship podiums ==
Event	Ranking	Result	Competition
3×3×3 multi-blind	2nd	54/66 1:00.00	Rubik's WCA North American Championship 2024

== World records ==
Event	Result	Competition
2×2×2 single	0.96 seconds	U.S. Nationals 2010
2×2×2 average	2.45 seconds	Brown Cubing Day 2009
2×2×2 average	3.15 seconds	Cumberland Valley Open 2009
3×3×3 multi-blind	63/66 59:50	New York Multimate PBQ 2025

== North American records ==
Event	Result	Competition
3×3×3 single	6.94 seconds	MIT Fall 2010
3×3×3 single	8.72 seconds	Washington D.C. Open 2010
3×3×3 single	8.91 seconds	Newark Open 2008
3×3×3 single	9.13 seconds	US Nationals and Open 2008
3×3x3 average	8.27 seconds	Bridgewater Open 2011
3×3x3 average	8.91 seconds	Liberty Science 2010
3×3x3 average	9.39 seconds	MIT Fall 2010
3×3x3 average	9.96 seconds	Harvard Fall 2010
3×3x3 average	10.39 seconds	Washington D.C. Open 2009
3×3x3 average	11.04 seconds	Brown Cubing Day 2009
2×2×2 single	1.03 seconds	Brown Cubing Day 2009
2×2×2 single	2.90 seconds	Cornell Spring 2008
2×2×2 average	3.35 seconds	Virginia Open 2008
4×4×4 single	29.30 seconds	World Championship 2013
4×4×4 single	31.65 seconds	River Hill Winter 2013
4×4×4 average	34.32 seconds	CSP Fall 2013
3×3x3 blindfolded single	59.66 seconds	Niagara Open Summer 2008
3x3x3 one-handed single	11.41 seconds	MIT Spring 2011
3x3x3 one-handed single	16.21 seconds	Toronto Open Winter 2008
3x3x3 one-handed average	14.92 seconds	MIT Fall 2011
3x3x3 one-handed average	15.97 seconds	MIT Fall 2010
3x3x3 one-handed average	16.24 seconds	Harvard Fall 2010
3x3x3 one-handed average	17.42 seconds	Long Island 2010
3x3x3 one-handed average	19.11 seconds	MIT Fall Competition 2009
Megaminx single	58.59	US Nationals 2011
3×3×3 multi-blind	4/4, 18:34	Kearny Kardinal 2008
3×3×3 multi-blind	5/8, 59.20	US Open 2007
