= Tommy Cherry =

American speedcuber (born 2005)

- Born: May 30, 2005 (age 21)
- Known for: Rubik's Cube speedcubing
Medal record
Representing United States
Speedcubing
WCA World Championship
Gold medal – first place	2023 Incheon	3×3×3 Blindfolded
Gold medal – first place	2023 Incheon	Clock
Silver medal – second place	2023 Incheon	4x4x4 Blindfolded
Silver medal – second place	2025 Seattle	3x3x3 Blindfolded
WCA North American Championship
Gold medal – first place	2022 Toronto	3×3×3 Blindfolded
Bronze medal – third place	2022 Toronto	5×5×5 Blindfolded
Bronze medal – third place	2022 Toronto	3×3×3 Multi-blind
Gold medal – first place	2024 Minneapolis	3×3×3 Blindfolded
Bronze medal – third place	2024 Minneapolis	5×5×5 Blindfolded
Gold medal – first place	2026 Raleigh	3×3×3 Blindfolded
CubingUSA Nationals
Bronze medal – third place	2019 Baltimore	3×3×3 With Feet
Gold medal – first place	2023 Pittsburgh	3×3×3 Blindfolded
Gold medal – first place	2023 Pittsburgh	Clock
Silver medal – second place	2023 Pittsburgh	4x4x4 Blindfolded
Bronze medal – third place	2023 Pittsburgh	3×3×3 Multi-blind
Bronze medal – third place	2024 Minneapolis	4x4x4 Blindfolded
Bronze medal – third place	2024 Minneapolis	5x5x5 Blindfolded
Gold medal – first place	2024 Minneapolis	3x3x3 Blindfolded
Gold medal – first place	2025 Providence	3×3×3 Blindfolded
Gold medal – first place	2026 Raleigh	3×3×3 Blindfolded

Tommy Cherry (born May 30, 2005) is an American Rubik's Cube speedcuber. He holds the world records for the fastest 3×3×3 blindfolded single solve with a time of 11.56 seconds and fastest 3×3×3 blindfolded average of 5 solves, with an average time of 13.97 seconds. He is also the first 4-time 3×3×3 blindfolded US Champion and only ever 3×3×3 blindfolded North American champion.

== Personal life ==
Cherry formerly competed in the Scripp's National Spelling Bee in 2019, after winning the 2018 and 2019 Regional Southeastern Florida Scripps Spelling Bees.

Cherry is a student at Florida State University and is the class of 2027

== Cubing career ==
Cherry started speedcubing in 2015. In 2018, he set his first world record with a 26.13 average in the 3x3 with feet category, and in 2021 he set his first world record in 3x3 blindfolded with a time of 15.27.

Cherry set the world record for the fastest Rubik's Cube solve blindfolded with a time of 12.00 seconds (the time includes memorization and solving) on February 11, 2024 at Triton Tricubealon 2024 in San Diego, California, United States. He also set the world record for the mean of three blindfolded solves with at time of 14.05 seconds on July 28, 2024 at the Rubik's WCA European Championship 2024 in Pamplona, Spain. Cherry reclaimed the world record single in 2026, with a 11.56 second single, reclaiming the world record from Charlie Eggins. Also, in 2026, Cherry broke his own tied world record average (previously tied with Charlie Eggins), achieving a 13.97 seconds average of five solves.

Cherry has achieved national, continental, and world championship podiums in the 3x3x3 Blindfolded event. He is the current US National Champion and North American champion, the 2023 World Champion, and the 2025 first runner-up for the event.

Cherry is also a skilled Rubik's Clock solver. He previously held world records in clock, and was the 2023 World Champion and US National Champion for the event.
