= Mats Valk =

Dutch speedcuber (born 1996)

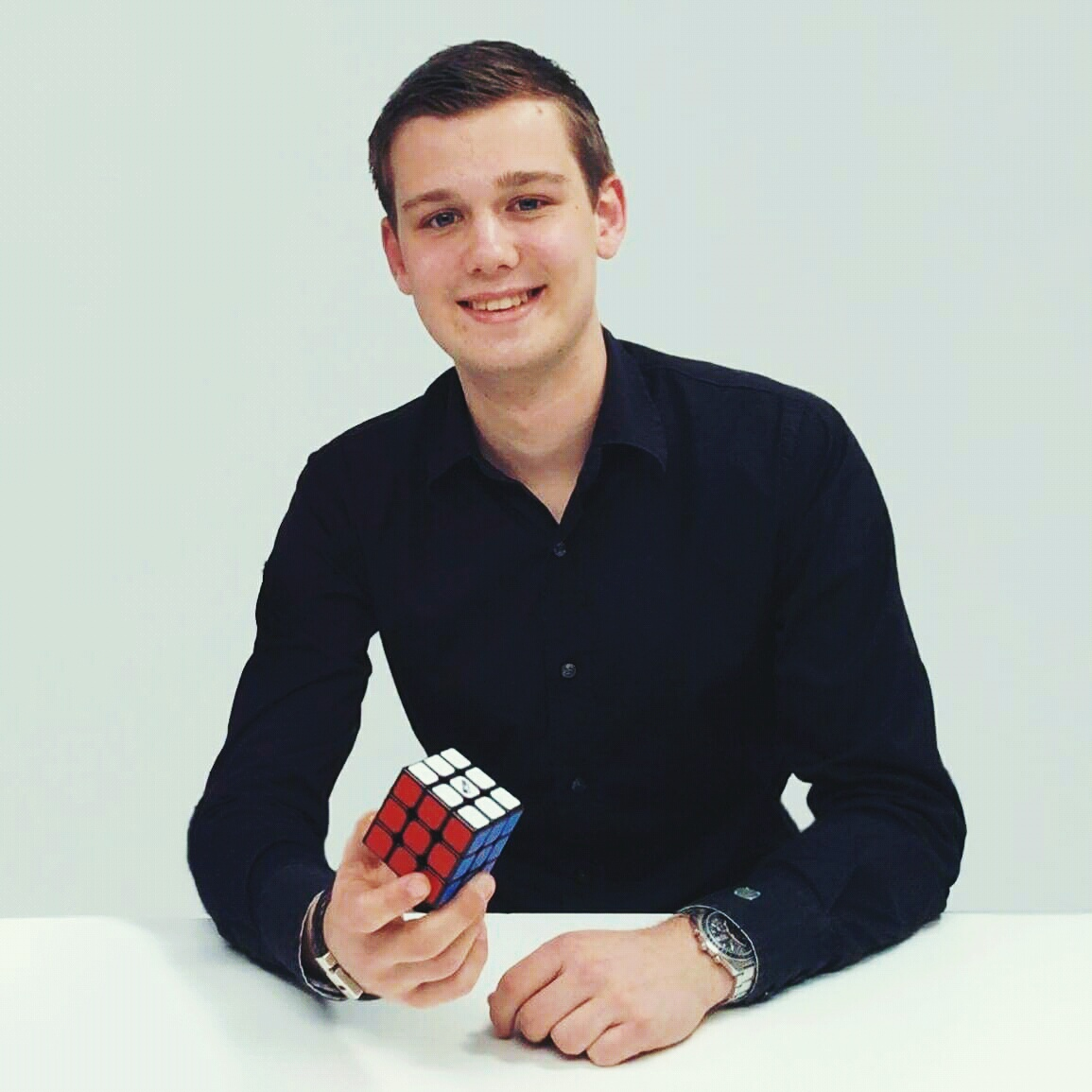
- Valk in 2016
- Born: 4 May 1996 (age 30); Amstelveen, Netherlands
- Occupation: Student
- Years active: 2007-present
- Known for: Rubik's Cube speedsolver
Medal record
Representing Netherlands
Speedcubing
WCA World Championship
Event	1st	2nd	3rd
3×3×3	0	2	0
2×2×2	0	0	1
4×4×4	0	0	2
3×3×3 Fewest Moves	0	0	1
Square-1	0	1	0
Total	0	3	4
Silver medal – second place	2011 Bangkok	Square-1
Silver medal – second place	2013 Las Vegas	3×3×3
Silver medal – second place	2015 São Paulo	3×3×3
Bronze medal – third place	2011 Bangkok	4×4×4
Bronze medal – third place	2013 Las Vegas	2×2×2
Bronze medal – third place	2013 Las Vegas	4×4×4
Bronze medal – third place	2017 Paris	3×3×3 Fewest Moves
European Championship
Event	1st	2nd	3rd
3×3×3	1	2	0
2×2×2	0	1	1
4×4×4	1	2	0
5×5×5	0	0	1
6×6×6	0	0	1
3×3×3 One-Handed	0	1	1
Square-1	0	1	1
Total	2	7	5
Gold medal – first place	2012 Warsaw	4×4×4
Gold medal – first place	2018 Madrid	3×3×3
Silver medal – second place	2010 Budapest	2×2×2
Silver medal – second place	2010 Budapest	3×3×3 One-Handed
Silver medal – second place	2010 Budapest	Square-1
Silver medal – second place	2012 Warsaw	3×3×3
Silver medal – second place	2014 Roskilde	4×4×4
Silver medal – second place	2016 Prague	3×3×3
Silver medal – second place	2016 Prague	4×4×4
Bronze medal – third place	2012 Warsaw	2×2×2
Bronze medal – third place	2012 Warsaw	Square-1
Bronze medal – third place	2012 Warsaw	3×3×3 One-Handed
Bronze medal – third place	2014 Roskilde	6×6×6
Bronze medal – third place	2018 Madrid	5×5×5

Mats Valk (born 4 May 1996) is a Dutch Rubik's Cube speedsolver. He broke the Rubik's cube single solve world record twice with times of 5.55 seconds in 2013 and 4.74 seconds in 2016. He won the Rubik's Cube European Championship in 2018 and was runner-up for 3x3x3 at the Rubik's Cube World Championships in 2013 and 2015.

== Biography ==
Valk was born and raised in Amstelveen, the Netherlands, a suburb of the Dutch capital Amsterdam.

Valk is most famous for breaking the Rubik's cube world record twice and being the runner-up at both the Rubik's cube world championships of 2013 and 2015. He first broke the world record with a time of 5.55 seconds at the Zonhoven Open 2013 in Belgium on 3 March 2013. This record stood for over 2 years. He later broke the world record again with a time of 4.74 seconds at the Jawa Timur Open 2016 in Indonesia on 6 November 2016. In December 2016, Valk looked on as Feliks Zemdegs overtook his world record by just 0.01 seconds.

Valk has also set three 4x4x4 world records, two for single solve and one for an average of 5. His second single world record, 26.77 seconds on 15 April 2012, was the first official 4x4x4 solve under 30 seconds. Altogether, Valk has broken 5 WCA world records, 17 European records, and 127 Dutch national records. Valk also currently holds the world record for solving the most Rubik's cubes in 1 hour, 374 cubes, set in Paris on 21 October 2015.

Valk is also known as a creator of the VLS (Valk Last Slot) 3x3x3 algorithm set, which correctly orients the last layer while inserting the last corner-edge pair of the first two layers. Valk used one of these algorithms to complete the cube in his 2016 3x3x3 world record.

== The Valk ==
Valk collaborated with the Chinese brand QiYi MoFangGe to set up his own brand, The Valk, creating cubes according to his own specifications. The design of the mechanism and the performance of the cube has to be approved by Valk himself before the cube is mass-produced and sold. The first cube released under this brand was the Valk 3 on 15 August 2016. This cube has been used by many other world-class speedcubers, including Patrick Ponce's former world record single. The size of the cube (5.55 cm each side) is a reference to his first Rubik's cube world record. He set his 2016 3x3x3 world record using a special magnetized version of this cube put together by TheCubicle.us, known as the Cubicle Valk 3 M. In 2018, QiYi released another Valk 3x3, the Valk Power and Power M, short for Valk Power Magnetic, the first copper core speedcube. Lastly, Qiyi released the newest Valk 3x3 called the Valk 3 Elite M. It has a dual magnet setting that no cube previously has had. The Valk Collection also has 2x2s, 4x4s, and a 5x5.

== Records ==
Record type	Event	Record time	Competition	Place	Date
World records	3x3x3 Cube Single	4.74 seconds	Jawa Timur Open 2016	Blitar, Indonesia	6 November 2016
World records	3x3x3 Cube Single	5.55 seconds	Zonhoven Open 2013	Zonhoven, Belgium	3 March 2013
World records	Most Rubik's Cubes solved in 1 hour (Note: Not an official WCA event.)	374 cubes	DYC Open 2015	Paris, France	21 October 2015
World records	4x4x4 Cube Single	26.77 seconds	German Open 2012	Gütersloh, Germany	14 April 2012
World records	4x4x4 Cube Single	30.02 seconds	Dutch Nationals 2011	Zaandam, Netherlands	17 December 2011
World records	4x4x4 Cube Average	33.57 seconds	German Open 2012	Gütersloh, Germany	14 April 2012
European records	3x3x3 Cube Single	5.13 seconds	European Championship 2016	Prague, Czech Republic	16 July 2016
European records	3x3x3 Cube Single	6.41 seconds	Dutch Open 2011	Eindhoven, Netherlands	30 October 2011
European records	3x3x3 Cube Single	6.84 seconds	Dutch Open 2011	Eindhoven, Netherlands	30 October 2011
European records	3x3x3 Cube Average	6.46 seconds	Semey Open 2018	Semey, Kazakhstan	9 June 2018
European records	3x3x3 Cube Average	7.24 seconds	DYC Open 2015	Paris, France	18 October 2015
European records	3x3x3 Cube Average	7.34 seconds	China Championship 2015	Guangzhou, China	4 October 2015
European records	3x3x3 Cube Average	7.45 seconds	Johannesburg 2014	Johannesburg, South Africa	23 November 2014
European records	3x3x3 Cube Average	7.66 seconds	Dutch Open 2012	Voorburg, Netherlands	4 November 2012
European records	3x3x3 Cube Average	7.77 seconds	Eindhoven Open 2012	Eindhoven, Netherlands	16 September 2012
European records	3x3x3 Cube Average	9.09 seconds	German Open 2011	Gütersloh, Germany	10 April 2011
European records	3x3x3 Cube Average	9.20 seconds	NEMO Amsterdam Open 2011	Amsterdam, Netherlands	2 April 2011
European records	4x4x4 Cube Average	35.10 seconds	Zonhoven Open 2012	Zonhoven, Belgium	26 February 2012
European records	5x5x5 Cube Single	49.49 seconds	Kaohsiung Open 2016	Kaohsiung, Taiwan	25 September 2016
European records	5x5x5 Cube Average	54.71 seconds	German Open 2017	Gutersloh, Germany	29 April 2017
European records	5x5x5 Cube Average	56.72 seconds	Kaohsiung Open 2016	Kaohsiung, Taiwan	25 September 2016
European records	3x3x3 Cube One Handed Average	17.00 seconds	Aachen Open 2011	Aachen, Germany	16 January 2011
European records	2x2x2 Average	2.43 seconds	Aachen Open 2011	Aachen, Germany	16 January 2011
