= Gancube =

Brand producing Rubik's cubes for speedcubing

- Industry: Technology
- Founded: 2014
- Founder: Jiang Ganyuan
- Headquarters: Guangzhou, China
- Products: Speedcubes
- Website: https://www.gancube.com/

GANCUBE is a Chinese speedcubing company that is a subsidiary of the Guangzhou Ganyuan Intelligent Technology Co., Ltd. Founded in 2014 by Jiang Ganyuan, GANCUBE is headquartered in Guangzhou, China. GAN is recognized by enthusiasts as the "Apple of Speedcubes". GANCUBE is currently one of the biggest speedcubing companies on the market, competing with other brands such as MoYu, QiYi, DaYan and YongJun. The company is most notable for their high quality speedcubes, with the GAN 12 Maglev being one of the most popular on the market.

== History ==
Jiang Ganyuan's interest in Rubik's cubes began in 1988 while studying Civil Engineering at Tongji University when he received one as a gift from his father. A few days later, he was able to solve it using an English manual.

In 2006, Ganyuan became China's first national champion in a speedcubing competition. A few years later, he became the cofounder of GuoJia, the first non-Rubik's DIY cube brand. However, due to unknown reasons, the company closed down.

In 2014, he founded the Guangzhou Ganyuan Intelligent Technology Company. And started the GANCUBE brand, which would specialize in producing speed cubes.

== Technologies ==
=== Magnetic Systems ===
In 2016, GANCUBE released the GAN356Air UM, the first cube to be mass-produced with magnets preinstalled in its edge and corner pieces to improve stability and speed.

In 2017, GAN created the GAN356 X, the first cube to have adjustable magnets. The GAN Magnetic System (GMS) in the GAN356 X used interchangeable magnet capsules and allowed the users to switch between Strong, Medium, Weak, and Null magnet strengths. GAN has created various other systems for magnet adjustment, with the GAN356 XS featuring movable edge magnets, and the GAN11 M Pro with movable and swappable corner magnets.

In 2020, Omnidirectional Core Positioning Magnetic Technology was introduced in the GAN11 M Pro, which included magnets not only between the corner and edge pieces, but also between the core and corners. The system uses 8 magnets in the core which are attracted to the magnets placed on the foot of the corner pieces to create a more gradual alignment on each turn. Moving the magnetic pull further into the cube improved stability and helped create a smooth and consistent feel.

In 2021, the GAN12 Maglev was released, and was the first mass-produced cube to use magnetic levitation (Maglev) technology. Replacing the springs found in previous releases with sets of repelling ring-shaped magnets allowed the cube to turn with much less friction.

In 2022, the GAN13 Maglev added magnets in the edge pieces which repel with the 8 core magnets. These magnets push the layers out of the partially turned state, creating an effect of auto-alignment. This feature is not present on the GAN15 Maglev.

=== Smart cubes ===
GAN launched the GAN356 i Bluetooth, their first smart cube, in 2018. Using various sensors, the GAN356 i tracked turns and rotations performed on the cube in real time. GAN has since released several other smart cubes, with improved tracking, adjustment features, convenience, and battery life. GAN's smart cubes can be connected via Bluetooth to the Cube Station smartphone app, which can display statistics, such as turns per second, rotations, and move count. This feedback can be helpful for users who wish to improve their technique and speed.

Through the app, interactive tutorials to learn how to solve the cube are offered. In these tutorials, difficult steps are divided into simple steps to make the fundamentals more approachable for beginners.

== Controversy ==
According to the Tech Media Platform KrASIA, GANCUBE has faced allegations of counterfeiting, plagiarism, and IP violations.

Cornelius Dieckmann is a German speedcuber that was sponsored by GANCUBE. His contract was terminated by GAN in 2019. GAN did not give the specific reason for this termination; however, it happened after he posted his political opinion on the relation between China and Taiwan on Facebook.
