= Did not finish =

Participant who does not finish a race

In racing, did not finish (DNF) denotes a result of a participant who does not finish a given race, either because of a mechanical failure, injury, or involvement in an accident. This may also be used in cases where the competitor has hit the time limit for the race, especially in speedcubing.

The term is used in:

- Automotive racing such as Formula One; NASCAR; IndyCar; off-road racing, including buggy, trucks, kart, and UTVs, both desert and short-track
- Motocross and quad racing, both desert and short-track
- Horse racing
- Competitive cycling
- Competitive track and distance running
- Competitive snow skiing and snowboarding
- Competitive swimming
- Speedcubing

Race participants try to avoid receiving a DNF, as some associate it with poor driving.

== Scholarly research ==
=== Decathlon competitors ===
Numerous studies have sought to figure out why DNF rates vary greatly, even within the same competitive discipline. For example, in track and field, Edouard found a 22% overall DNF rate among high level decathlon competitors but DNF rates in individual events ranging from less than 1% to over 6%.

DNFs are also not always evenly distributed across all participants. For example, a 2009 New York Times analysis of New York City Marathon results concluded that recreational competitors were more likely to finish the race rather than be classified as DNF: "Elite runners seem more inclined to drop out rather than simply complete the race, and runners visiting from abroad seem more inclined to push themselves to the finish line no matter their time." Glace et al. (2002) performed ANOVA analysis of finishers as compared to DNFs in an ultramarathon and concluded that they had statistically different nutrition and liquid intake. Holbrook et al. found physiological differences between finishers and DNFs among horses engaging in long-distance races.

== Types of DNF ==
=== Auto racing ===
In auto racing a DNF usually occurs due to a mechanical failure, an accident, or driver fatigue, prevents a driver from finishing a race.

=== Skiing ===
In skiing, especially in the speed disciplines of downhill and super-G, a DNF can denote an athlete who has lost control and crashes off their skis.

Athletes can also DNF without crashing if they stray too far outside the racing line. This might occur through skiing out, where an athlete misses a gate at any point during a ski race. The consequences of doing so are instant elimination from the event even if it spans multiple runs, as slalom, giant slalom and the combined events do at the Winter Olympics.

=== Off-road racing ===
In off-road racing a DNF might cost a racing team a points championship in its racing class. It is not uncommon though that the more races in a season, the better chance another team will DNF, therefore a championship and purse could still be won.

=== Swimming ===
In swimming, a DNF can occur when a swimmer starts a race, but fails to complete it in any means. This can occur due to injury, the race being stopped and no times being recorded (with the race not being re-run), or in the very rare circumstance, the swimmer opts to leave the pool before the race has concluded. While the latter does usually come with a disqualification from the race, in less formal racing settings such as school carnivals, a DNF may be recorded as opposed to a DSQ as the swimmer is usually not making a serious attempt at competing for a time. DNFs in this regard usually occur for longer and tougher events, such as the 400m, 800m and 1500m Freestyle, and the 200 Butterfly.

=== Speedcubing ===
In speedcubing, a DNF most often occurs when a speedcuber fails to solve a puzzle; in the regulations of the World Cube Association, this is defined as being more than one move away from a puzzle's solved state. A DNF can also be given due to other infractions of the regulations, or as the recorded result when a competitor is disqualified.

== Related terms ==
- Did not start (DNS)
- Did not qualify (DNQ)
- Did not pre-qualify (DNPQ)
- Did not improve (DNI)
- Disqualified (DSQ)
