= Sean Patrick Villanueva =

Speedcuber from the Philippines

- Born: March 7, 2008 (age 18); Philippines
- Occupation: Speedcuber
- Website: www.worldcubeassociation.org/persons/2017VILL41

Sean Patrick Villanueva is a Filipino speedcuber who is the former World Cube Association 3×3×3 one-handed world champion who won the title in Incheon, South Korea in August 2023 with an average time of 9.42 seconds. He previously held the Asian Record for 3x3x3 one-handed average at 8.64 seconds, which he set at Santa Cruz Speedcubing 2024 in Santa Cruz, Laguna on January 28, 2024. He currently holds the 3x3x3 one-handed world record average with a time of 8.09 seconds, set on May 26, 2024 at Quezon City Open II 2024 in Quezon City, Philippines.

Previously, he placed second in the World Cube Association World Championship 2019 3×3×3 event with an average time of 6.78 seconds, which was 0.04 seconds slower than that of Philipp Weyer who placed first. This finish made Villanueva the youngest competitor to place in the top three of the main 3×3×3 event at 11 years old. He first entered the world of speedcubing competition by placing 201st in the Philippine Championship 2017.

On July 2, 2023, he got the fastest official single solve using the Roux method of 4.11s, which placed him in the global top 10.

== Personal life ==
As of 2024, the 17-year old is currently a grade 12 student at the Ateneo de Manila University.
