= 1982 Rubik's Cube World Championship =

World Championship for the Rubik's cube held in 1982

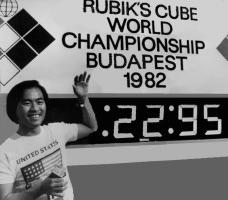
- Minh Thai standing next to the timer after setting his 22.95 world record single

Tournament information
- Sport: Speedcubing
- Location: Budapest, Hungary
- Date: 5 June 1982
- Teams: 19

Final champion
- Minh Thai

The 1982 World Speedcubing Championship was the first official international competition in the speed solving of the Rubik's Cube, held on June 5, 1982, in Budapest, Hungary. Nineteen competitors from various countries took part in it. The championship was held against the backdrop of aworldwide craze for the Rubik's Cube , marking the peak of the puzzle's popularity. It was widely covered by the media in many countries. The World Championship was not the first major Rubik's Cube competition—prior national championships and smaller competitions had been held in Hungary and some other countries—but due to its global significance, it became the first and only competition in the 20th century recognized by the World Cube Association.

The average age of the competition participants was about 20 years old. The youngest participant was 14 years old, and the two oldest were 26. The winner of the competition was 16-year-old Los Angeles student of Vietnamese descent, Minh Thái . He used his own assembly method, which he described in his book, The Winning Solution.

In the 20th century, world or continental speedcubing championships were no longer held, as the spread of video games led to a decline in interest in mechanical puzzles. The second speedcubing world championship was held only in 2003. In the 21st century, four participants from the first world championship participated in official speedcubing competitions.

In honor of the 1982 World Cup, a postage stamp of the Hungarian People's Republic was issued that same year, designed by the famous designer Pál Varga, depicting a mechanical stopwatch, hands solving a Rubik's cube, the emblem of the World Cup and its name in Hungarian.

== Organization ==
The championship was exceptionally well organized. It was held in Budapest's Vigadó Concert Hall, where a large illuminated structure was installed. Ernő Rubik himself opened the competition. One of the judges, Professor David Singmaster, noted that the competition was very efficiently organized, with the exception of one instance when the timer did not work. According to him, the cubes provided to the participants were rated as quite easy to rotate. However, Jessica Fridrich noted 15 years later that the cubes rotated rather stiffly and were generally not suitable for speed solving. Moreover, according to her, the cubes provided, with a Western color scheme (common at the beginning of the 21st century), were not very common at the time and were a novelty for many participants.

== Regulations ==
The only competitive discipline at the championship was speed solving a 3x3x3 cube. All competitors were provided with identical original cubes, previously tested personally by the inventor. They were scrambled using a random number generator with 25-30 rotations. They were given 15 seconds for inspection , and no more than 60 seconds for solution. Competitors made three attempts, the best of which counted. Time was measured using a mat with a built-in diode, which recorded the cube's position on it. If the cube broke during solution, the competitor was given a second attempt, but if it broke a second time, the attempt could no longer be counted.

The winners were awarded gold, silver and bronze cube-shaped statuettes.

Since the rules for speedcubing competitions at that time differed from those of today, they were not taken into account when the WCA database was created in 2004. The World Championship was an exception—its results were included in the ranking of single attempts. Four participants of the first World Championship subsequently (in the 21st century) competed in other official speedcubing competitions.

== Results ==
The results were:

Place	Name	Time	Status	Country	Attempt 1	Attempt 2	Attempt 3
1	Minh Thai	22.95	WR	USA	27.16	22.95	27.97
2	Guus Razoux Schultz	24.32	ER	Netherlands	24.32	31.51	26.51
3	Zoltán Lábas	24.49	NR	Hungary	24.49	27.58	28.21
4	Lars Petrus	24.57	NR	Sweden	35.42	33.11	24.57
5	Ken'ichi Ueno (上野健一)	24.91	AsR	Japan	27.56	27.90	24.91
6	Jérôme Jean-Charles	25.06	NR	France	27.87	31.18	25.06
7	Julian Chilvers	25.95	NR	United Kingdom	30.59	25.95	27.46
8	Duc Trinh	26.63	NR	Canada	37.44	26.63	36.09
9	Giuseppe Romeo	28.11	NR	Italy	34.23	41.75	28.11
10	Jessica Fridrich	29.11	NR	Czech Republic	31.49	29.11	33.20
11	Eduardo Valdivia Chacón	29.62	SAR	Peru	34.91	29.62	30.01
12	Luc Van Laethem	29.73	NR	Belgium	32.92	34.98	29.73
13	József Borsos	30.02	NR	Yugoslavia	36.75	35.33	30.02
14	Ronald Brinkmann	30.59	NR	Germany	34.80	30.59	32.52
15	Jari Sandqvist	31.17	NR	Finland	31.17	DNF*	31.56
16	Manuel Galrinho	37.11	NR	Portugal	40.74	48.67	37.11
17	Piotr Serbeński	37.50	NR	Poland	44.40	37.50	40.86
18	Svilen Tenev	47.29	NR	Bulgaria	51.88	47.29	47.35
19	Josef Trajber	50.16	NR	Austria	50.16	54.93	58.99

WR = World Record

ER = European Record

AsR = Asian Record

SAR = South American Record

NR = National Record

- Sandqvist's second attempt was disqualified, since his cube was broken twice in the same attempt. This was a violation of the competition rules, and the attempt was stopped at that point.
