= Yiheng Wang =

Chinese speedcuber (born 2013)

Wang Yiheng
- Born: 16 December 2013 (age 12); Xuzhou, Jiangsu, China
- Known for: Rubik's Cube speedsolving

Chinese name
- Traditional Chinese: 王藝衡
- Simplified Chinese: 王艺衡
Transcriptions
Standard Mandarin
- Hanyu Pinyin: Wáng Yìhéng
Medal record
Representing China
Speedcubing
WCA World Championship
Gold medal – first place	2025 Seattle	3x3x3
Silver medal – second place	2023 Incheon	3x3x3
Silver medal – second place	2025 Seattle	2x2x2
WCA Asian Championship
Gold medal – first place	2024 Putrajaya	3x3x3
Gold medal – first place	2024 Putrajaya	2x2x2

Yiheng Wang (Chinese: 王艺衡; pinyin: Wáng Yìhéng; born 16 December 2013) is a Chinese competitive speedcuber who holds the 4th fastest single solve of 2.77 seconds, and the world record fastest average of 3.51 seconds. He also holds the second best 2x2x2 average with a time of 0.88 seconds, and the second best 3x3 one-handed single of 5.85 seconds.

Wang became World Cube Association (WCA) World Champion on the 6th of July 2025 with a 4.23 second average.

== Career ==
In summer 2019, at age five, Wang got his first Rubik's Cube shortly after his mother had learnt of the puzzle and its mechanics herself. Three months later, Wang entered his first WCA competition in September 2019. He won his first competition title in January 2021, at age seven.

In 2023, Wang set his first major record, the 3x3x3 Asian record average at a competition in Singapore, with an average (Note: average of 5 solves with the fastest and slowest solves discounted) of 4.91 seconds. The previous record of 5.24 seconds had been held by Filipino speedcuber Leo Borromeo. This was the first sub-5 second average in Asia.

On 10 March 2023, at nine years old, Wang set his first 3x3x3 world record average at a competition in Kuala Lumpur, Malaysia, with an average (Note: average of 5 solves with the fastest and slowest solves discounted) of 4.69 seconds. The previous record of 4.86 seconds had been held jointly by United States' Max Park and Poland's Tymon Kolasiński. Between March 10, 2023 and January 10, 2026 he set 9 consecutive records in the event, lowering the 3x3x3 average world record from 4.86 (which was jointly held by Max Park and Tymon Kolasiński) to 4.69, 4.48, 4.36, 4.25, 4.09, 4.09 (again), 4.05, 4.03, 3.91, and eventually 3.90.

In August 2023, Wang came within 0.01 seconds of winning the 2023 WCA World Championship, finishing in second place behind Max Park and just ahead of Poland's Tymon Kolasiński. Two years later, on July 6, 2025, he became WCA World Champion with a 4.23 second average, finishing ahead of fellow Chinese speedcuber Xuanyi Geng.

Wang's global 3x3x3 dominance peaked in September 2025 when he held the 28 all-time fastest averages, ranging from 4.31 through to 3.90 seconds. As of October 9, 2026, he holds 67 of the top 100 3x3x3 averages. He also has the 4th fastest 3x3x3 single, at 2.77 seconds.

In February 2025, Wang broke the 3x3x3 world record single, with a time of 3.08 seconds, although this record would be broken later by Xuanyi Geng. On 25 May 2025, Wang set a new 3x3x3 world record average of 3.91 seconds, becoming the first person in history to record a sub-4 second average in official competition. By this point, Wang had trained up to six hours each day in preparation for competitions with his coach Li Chunxiao, although this subsequently decreased to one to two hours of training by 2026.

In June 2026, Wang broke the 3x3x3 world record average, then held by Xuanyi Geng, with a time of 3.51 seconds, beating the previous record by 0.2 seconds. In August 2026, Wang broke the 3x3x3 Asian record single, then also held by Xuanyi Geng, with a time of 2.77 seconds, at the Maoming Open 2026. This was the third ever official sub-3 second single. One day later, at the Zhanjiang Open 2026, Wang broke the 3x3 one-handed Asian record single, with a time of 5.85 seconds. Before the record, he had never gotten a single solve under 8 seconds.

== 2x2x2 world record average controversies ==
=== "Sliding" incidents ===
On 22 June 2024 in Johor Bahru, Malaysia, Wang achieved a world record average of 0.78 seconds on the 2x2x2. However, the manner in which Wang started the competition-standard StackMat timer drew criticism; frame-by-frame analysis of the solves revealed that Wang had touched or even begun turning the puzzle before lifting his hands off the timer in some of the solves, both of which constitute individual two-second penalties. The technique was dubbed "sliding", as it involves sliding the hands forward to greet the puzzle rather than lifting them up, thus temporarily keeping the timer from starting and recording a faster time. Despite possible evidence of regulation violations from frame-by-frame video analysis, however, only full-speed video analysis was considered valid evidence for penalization, due to precedent set in a decision from 2019.

On 27 September 2024, the WCA Regulations Committee (WRC), responsible for deciding on such unresolved and uncovered incidents released a joint statement with the WCA Board of Directors on the matter; while the WRC announced that it would now use frame-by-frame analysis in certain cases such as world records, the Board concluded that Wang's solves "could not be conclusively determined to be in violation of the WCA Regulations, policies, and procedures which are in place at the time of the attempt, and cannot be retroactively applied to previous attempts".

On 11 October 2024, the board publicly returned penalization discretion to the WRC. On 25 October 2024, the WRC announced Wang's solves would be retroactively penalized, changing the result from 0.78 to 3.47 and thus stripping Wang of sole possession of the world record; his second-best average of 0.92 seconds from the same event is identical to the average set by Zayn Khanani of the United States at New Cumberland County 2024, meaning Wang and Khanani jointly held the record until 15 December 2024, when Wang achieved an average of 0.86 seconds.

On 18 March 2025, Wang's 0.86-second average was penalized following a review by the WRC, which determined that three of the five solves involved sliding. As a result, the 2x2x2 world record average reverted to Wang's 0.88-second time set at Hangzhou Open 2024. However, the WRC stated the poor timer starts appeared to be unintentional in this situation.

== List of world records ==
List of world records set by Yiheng Wang
3x3x3 Cube
Single	Average	Competition	Round	Date
	3.51	Heifei Cubing League III	Final	17.06.2026
	3.90	Taizhou Open 2025	Second round	26.07.2025
	3.91	Lishui Open 2025	Second round	25.05.2025
	4.03	Xi'an Cherry Blossom 2025	Final	05.04.2025
3.08		XMUM Cube Open 2025	Second round	16.02.2025
	4.05	Zhengzhou Open 2024	Final	08.12.2024
	4.09	Rubik's WCA Asian Championship 2024	First round	02.11.2024
	4.09	Xuzhou Autumn 2024	Final	21.09.2024
	4.25	Deqing Small Cubes Summer 2024	First round	25.08.2024
	4.36	Philippine Championship 2024	First round	06.07.2024
	4.48	Mofunland Cruise Open 2023	Final	20.06.2023
	4.69	Yong Jun KL Speedcubing 2023	Semi Final	12.03.2023
2x2x2 Cube
Single	Average	Competition	Round	Date
	0.88	Hangzhou Open 2024	Second round	15.12.2024
	0.92	Johor Cube Open 2024	Second round	22.06.2024
	0.93	Twist & Fries Johor Bahru 2024	Second round	24.02.2024

== Notable rankings ==
Wang's rankings as of 24 October 2026:

Event	Format	Time (sec)	World Rank	Continental Rank
3×3×3	Single	2.77	4	3
3×3×3	Ao5	3.51	1	1
2x2x2	Single	0.45	7	5
2x2x2	Ao5	0.88	2	1
3×3×3 one-handed	Single	5.85	3	1
3×3×3 one-handed	Ao5	9.29	42	17
Pyraminx	Single	0.98	39	7
Pyraminx	Ao5	1.79	82	22
