= Speedcubing =

Competitive solving of combination puzzles

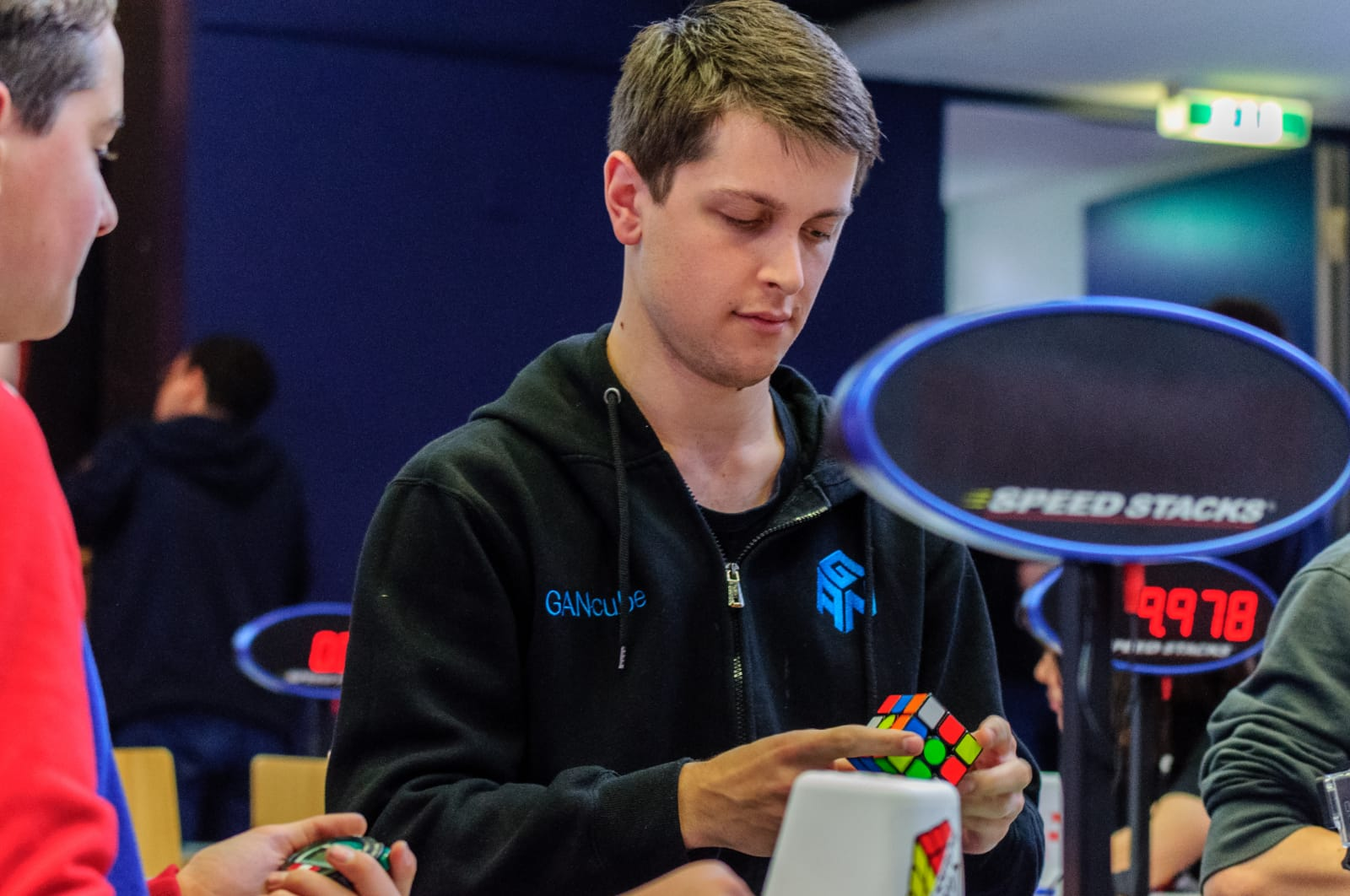
- Speedcuber Feliks Zemdegs preparing to solve a 3×3×3 Rubik's Cube at a competition in 2018
- Highest governing body: World Cube Association
- Nicknames: Speedsolving; Cubing
- First played: 1982, Budapest, Hungary
- Registered players: 245,000+

Characteristics
- Contact: No
- Team members: Individual
- Type: Mind sport
- Equipment: 3×3×3 Cube; 2×2×2 Cube; 4×4×4 Cube; 5×5×5 Cube; 6×6×6 Cube; 7×7×7 Cube; Pyraminx; Megaminx; Skewb; Square-1; Rubik's Clock (to be removed after the 2027 World Championship); Face Turning Octahedron (Upcoming in 2027)

Presence
- Country or region: Worldwide
- Olympic: No

Speedcubing, also known as speedsolving or simply cubing, is the competitive practice of solving combination puzzles as quickly as possible. It is recognized as a mind sport in which competitors, known as speedcubers or simply cubers, solve mechanical puzzles under standardized conditions to achieve the fastest times or, in some events, the fewest moves.

The 3×3×3 Rubik's Cube is the most prominent puzzle in speedcubing and serves as the sport's flagship event. Competitive solving relies on pattern recognition, memorization of algorithms, inspection, and efficient finger movements known as finger tricks. Speedcubers commonly employ established solving methods such as CFOP, Roux, ZZ, and Petrus to reduce solving times.

International speedcubing competitions are governed by the World Cube Association (WCA), a non-profit organization founded in 2004 that standardizes regulations and maintains official rankings and world records. The WCA currently recognises 17 official events, including 2×2×2 through 7×7×7 cube events, Pyraminx, Megaminx, Skewb, Square-1, Rubik's Clock, 3×3×3 One-Handed, 3×3×3 Fewest Moves, 3×3×3 Blindfolded, 4×4×4 Blindfolded, 5×5×5 Blindfolded, and 3×3×3 Multi-Blind. Official competitions are held in more than 100 countries and attract hundreds of thousands of registered competitors worldwide.

The first international Rubik's Cube championship was held in Budapest, Hungary, in 1982. Following the establishment of the WCA, competitive speedcubing expanded rapidly, becoming a global sport with hundreds of sanctioned competitions organized annually.

As of August 2026, the official WCA world record for the fastest single solve of the 3×3×3 Rubik's Cube is 2.51 seconds, set by Xuanyi Geng from China. The world record average of five consecutive solves is 3.51 seconds, set by Chinese speedcuber Yiheng Wang at Hefei Cubing League 3×3 III 2026. Official world records for all speedcubing events are recognized and maintained by the World Cube Association.

== History ==
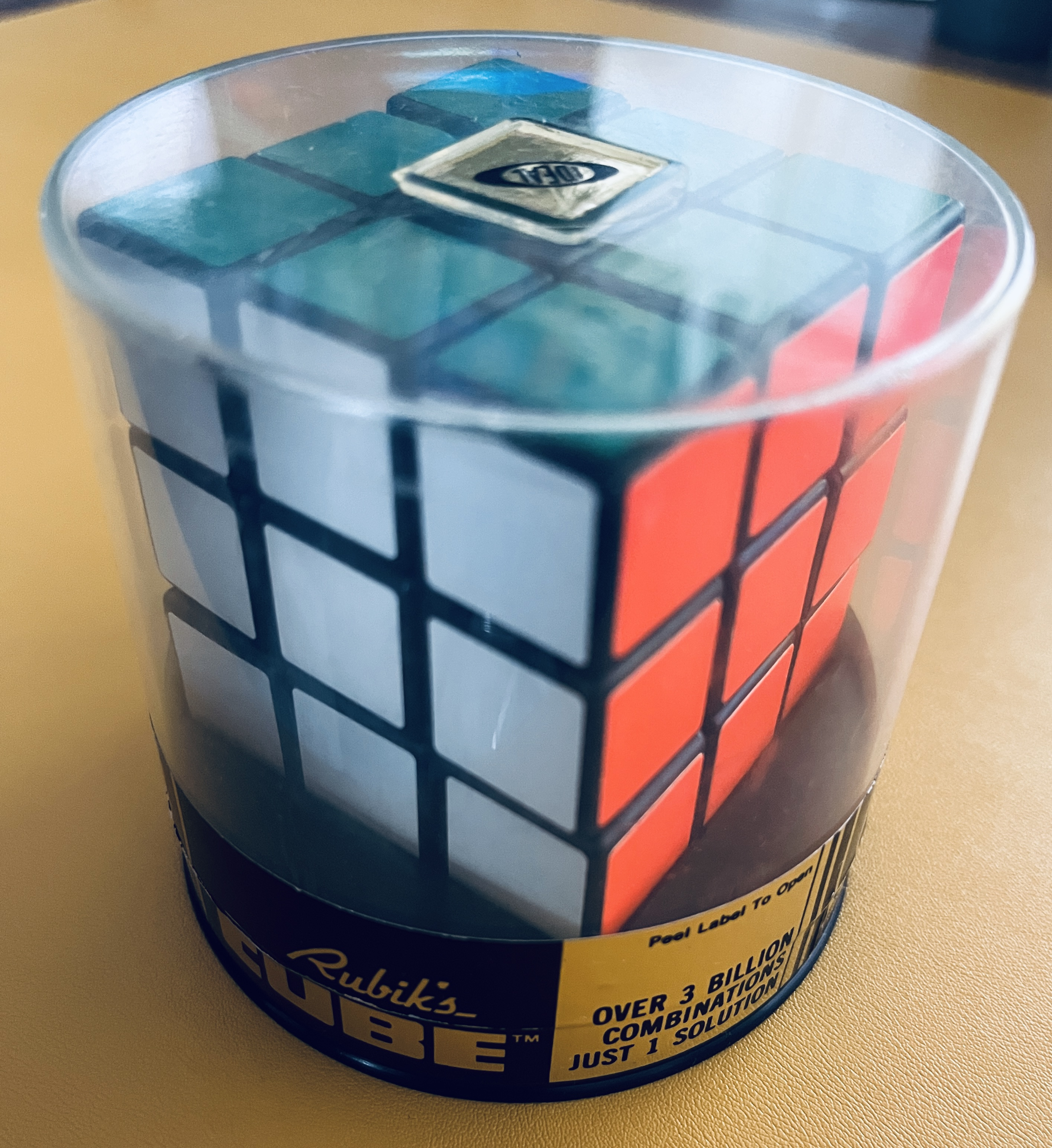
An original Rubik's Cube from 1980 in Hungary

The Rubik's Cube was invented on 19 May 1974, by Hungarian professor of architecture Ernő Rubik. In 1979, Rubik partnered with Ideal Toy Company to garner widespread international interest in the cube. On 5 June 1982, the first world championship of speedcubing was held in Budapest, Hungary. Nineteen people competed in the event, and the American Minh Thai won with a single solve time of 22.95 seconds, which was, at the time, the fastest Rubik's Cube solve ever recorded. Other attendees include Jessica Fridrich and Lars Petrus, both of whom later contributed to the development of new solving methods and the speedcubing community. The Rubik's Cube waned in popularity after 1983, as there were no official competitions held, but with the advent of the Internet, online websites began to surface to discuss the cube. With these websites facilitating the renewed popularity of the cube, a new generation of speedcubers arose.

Those prominent in the online speedsolving community, such as Ron van Bruchem, Tyson Mao, Chris Hardwick, and Ton Dennenbroek, eventually wanted to create an organization where cubers from around the world could meet and compete against each other. In 2003, they organized a championship in Toronto, Ontario, followed by another competition in the Netherlands later that same year. This revival of competition sparked a new wave of organized speedcubing events, which included regular national and international competitions. There were twelve competitions in 2004, 58 more from 2005 to 2006, over 100 in 2008, and over 1150 in 2018. Since Budapest's 1982 competition, there have been eleven further World Championships traditionally held every other year. Every world championship has been held on an odd-numbered year (2025, 2023). This new wave of speedcubing competitions has been and still is organized by the World Cube Association (WCA).

Since the rise of speedcubing's popularity, numerous entrepreneurial ventures have been founded specializing in making or selling speedcubes, creating competition between these brands and Rubik's. Dozens of cube manufacturers, such as GANCUBE, MoYu (魔域文化), YJ (永骏), QiYi (奇艺魔方格), DaYan (大雁), DianSheng (点盛), ShengShou (圣手), YuXin (裕鑫), and Vin Cube have begun improving the cube's technology by creating many different speedcubes to allow for smoother turning and faster solving. This has helped to facilitate the eventual rise of the Rubik's Cube as not just a toy, but also a lucrative business.

== World Cube Association ==
The World Cube Association (WCA) is a non-profit organization which organizes speedcubing competitions and ratifies results. The WCA consists of the WCA Board, WCA Committee, and the WCA Council. The WCA Board is the head or leader of the entire WCA, and is responsible for fulfilling tasks not completed or done by the WCA Committee and WCA Council. The WCA Appeals Committee (WAC) is responsible for ensuring right and fair decisions in accordance with the WCA Regulations. The WCA Committee is also responsible for reviewing and resolving appeals regarding the decisions of other WCA Staff members. The WCA Council is a special type of team that serves as an advisory role to the WCA, and consists of community members, and not WCA Staff Members. These WCA Staff Members are part of a cubing community, which consist of organizers, who organize and manage cubing competitions, and delegates, who help in managing competitions and help competitors who are unfamiliar with the competition environment, and to decide whether a competitor's solve should be penalized or not. WCA Regulations are required to be followed by competitors and can be found on the official WCA website.

== Methods ==
=== 3×3×3 ===
The standard 3×3×3 can be solved using several methods. The most commonly used methods for speedcubing are CFOP, Roux, and ZZ, which are generally considered to achieve the fastest times. An emerging method, named ZB, is currently being adopted by the fastest cubers. It consists of learning 400+ algorithms and is incredibly dependent on pattern recognition and memorization. The CFOP method is used by the majority of cubers and employs a layer-by-layer system with numerous algorithms for solving the final layer. The method starts by creating a cross on any side of the cube, followed by F2L where 4 corner edge pairs are inserted into the cross, followed by OLL (Orientation of the Last Layer) where the top side is solved in 1 of 57 algorithms, and finally PLL (Permutation of the Last Layer) where you do 1 of 21 algorithms to solve the rest of the cube. Roux, the second most popular method, which starts by forming a 1×2×3 block on one side of the cube, repeating it on the other side, and solves the middle and top layer last, uses fewer algorithms. ZZ uses a unique step called Edge Orientation to improve the ergonomics of turning by removing the amount of rotations during a solve. Another notable method is Petrus, which has been popular at times in the past; however, it is now considered sub-optimal to CFOP and Roux and was abandoned due to its unfavorable finger tricks.

Solving larger cubes, such as 4×4×4 and 5×5×5, is most often done by reducing them to 3×3×3 and solving them like so, while 2×2×2 can be solved with the same or similar methods as 3×3×3. However, specialized 2×2×2 methods are quicker, and are regarded as superior to 3×3×3 methods. These methods include Ortega, CLL, and the EG method (which can allow users to plan the entire solution during inspection).

==== CFOP ====
CFOP speedsolver in a speedcubing competition

The CFOP (abbreviation for Cross – F2L – OLL – PLL) method, also known as the Fridrich method after one of its inventors, Jessica Fridrich, who finished second in the 2003 Rubik's Cube World Championships, is the most commonly used method in speedcubing today. Its origins are credited to David Singmaster, who was one of the first to publish a layer-by-layer method of solving in 1980, and Guus Razoux Schultz, who built upon this and developed a more efficient system for the first two layers (F2L). Jessica Fridrich then finished developing the method and published it online in 1997, an event that was very influential in the revival of competitive speedcubing. The first step of the method is to solve a cross of edge pieces on the first layer. The remainder of the first layer and all of the second layer are then solved together in what is referred to as "corner-edge pairs," or slots. Finally, the last layer is solved in two steps – first, all of the pieces in the layer are oriented to form a solid colour (but without the individual pieces always being in their correct places on the cube). This step is referred to as orientation and is usually performed with a single set of algorithms known as OLL (Orientation of the Last Layer). Then, all of those pieces are permuted to their correct spots. This is also usually performed as a single set of PLL (Permutation of the Last Layer) algorithms. OLL and PLL use 57 and 21 algorithms, respectively. Cross, First 2 Layers, Orientation, Permutation (CFOP) is the most popular method for speedsolving the Rubik's Cube. It is the method used by all 3×3 world record holders in the last decade.

The CFOP method can be used as a less advanced method by dividing the steps into more steps, reducing the number of algorithms that need to be learned but sacrificing time. It is usually known as the beginner method or layer by layer (LBL). Most people start learning CFOP with 4LLL (Four-Look Last Layer), which is the less advanced, slower, and algorithm-reducing (from 78 algorithms to 16) way to learn CFOP. The 4 steps are divided into edge orientation, corner orientation, corner permutation, and edge permutation (which can be called EO, CO, CP, and EP). Later on, full OLL, which has 57 algorithms, and full PLL, which has 21 algorithms, can be learned. An average CFOP user that solves with full OLL and PLL, along with an efficient cross (which takes 8 moves at maximum) and efficient F2L (which takes almost 30 moves), consists of 55–60 moves, which means that it has a higher move count than Roux and ZZ. However, finger tricks and algorithms are more researched with CFOP than any other method, which explains why the majority of the fastest speedcubers use CFOP as their main speedcubing method.

The CFOP method is the most widely used speed-solving method. It is a more efficient version of the Layer-By-Layer method (also known as the beginner's method). It is very popular due to the vast amount of resources that teach and improve upon the CFOP method. Many top speedcubers, including two-time World Champions Feliks Zemdegs and Max Park, learn additional sets of algorithms for the last slot and layer, such as Corners of Last Layer (COLL), which orients and permutes the corners when the edges are oriented, or Winter Variation (or the larger Valk Last Slot algorithm superset, or VLS), which finishes OLL while inserting the last pair, and ZB, when the solver has one pair left he needs to use an algorithm set to solve the top colour cross while solving the last pair (ZBLS: Zborowski Bruchem Last Slot). And after ZBLS comes ZBLL to solve the rest of the cube. This method is used for both world records.

Pseudoslotting is a technique that allows advanced CFOP solvers to be more creative with efficient solutions. It is an alternative method to F2L, where instead of creating and inserting pairs with matching colours, the bottom layer is intentionally misaligned to allow different pieces to be paired together. This provides more freedom while pairing pieces during F2L. Pseudoslotting is similar to keyhole, a technique in which the bottom layer is misaligned to allow a piece to be inserted independently of its solved counterpart. It is widely believed that Tymon Kolasiński (the second best in Europe) is the best speedcuber who uses pseudoslotting. With practice, recognition becomes easier and the execution is done by muscle memory.

The ZB method, a variation of CFOP, has become more popular among top solvers. The ZB method combines the ZBLS and ZBLL algorithm sets with the Cross and F2L steps, which together allow the solver to complete the last F2L pair and all of the last layer in just 2 algorithms. Solvers like Xuanyi Geng, Qixian Cao, and Tymon Kolasiński are among the first and best to adopt this method. The ZB method requires the solver to memorize 795 unique algorithms, which makes this a major barrier to entry, especially for older solvers. However, there is debate as to whether the ZB method is actually faster overall, since by cutting down on the steps required to solve the cube, solvers decrease the possibility for luck in their solves.

==== Roux ====
The Roux method was invented by French speedcuber Gilles Roux. The first step of the Roux method is to form a 3×2×1 block, usually placed in the lower portion of the left layer. The second step is creating another 3×2×1 on the opposite side, so each block shares a bottom colour. The creation of these blocks is commonly known as "block-building". The remaining four corners are then solved using a set of algorithms known as CMLL (Corners of the Last Layer, without regard to the M-slice), which leaves six edges and four centers that are solved in the last step, L6E or LSE (Last Six Edges).

This method is not as dependent on algorithm memorization as the CFOP method since all but the third step is done with intuition as opposed to predefined sets of algorithms. Because of the frequent use of M moves, the Roux method can be performed without any rotations (unlike the CFOP method), which means it is easier to look ahead (solving pieces while at the same time looking for the solution to the next step) while solving. It is also considered one of the most efficient speedsolving methods, with its average move count being between 45 and 50 moves for experienced solvers. However, the Roux method of speedcubing has been criticized over the years because, unlike CFOP, ZZ, or Petrus, Roux requires M (middle layer) slices to solve LSE. Using M slice moves makes it harder to achieve higher TPS (turns per second) because the finger tricks are almost always flicks, but high TPS is achievable through training.

One of the users of this method, Kian Mansour, broke the one-handed (OH) world record average with a time of 9.54 seconds. Sean Patrick Villanueva is the first Roux user to achieve a sub-6 average of five in competition and is currently ranked twenty-sixth in the world by 3×3 average. He also podiumed in 3×3 at the WCA World Championship 2019 (2nd Place). On 25 May 2024, he broke the OH WR average with the largest margin in nearly 10 years, bringing it down from 8.62 to 8.09 seconds. He also broke the WR single with a 6.05 a few weeks later, though he lost this to Dhruva Sai Meruva, a CFOP one-hand solver on 6 October 2024.

==== ZZ ====
The ZZ method (short for Zbigniew Zborowski) is a speedcubing method proposed by Zbigniew Zborowski in 2006 and subsequently refined by the speedcubing community. It combines blockbuilding and layer-by-layer techniques, with an emphasis on movement ergonomics to enable high turning speeds. The method begins with EOCross, its defining step, in which all edges are oriented while the cross pieces are solved. A variation, EOLine, orients all edges while solving only the front and back cross edges, and is commonly used for one-handed solving.

The remaining first two layers are then solved using only left, right, up, and down face turns, eliminating the need for cube rotations. Because all edges are oriented during EOCross, the last-layer edges are already correctly oriented once F2L is complete. The last layer can then be solved using a variety of techniques, including those used in the CFOP method. An advanced variant, ZBLL (Zborowski–Bruchem Last Layer), completes the last layer in a single step with an average of just over 12 moves, but requires memorizing 493 algorithms.

Compared with the CFOP method, ZZ typically requires fewer moves, averaging about 53.5 compared with CFOP's 55–60. Its emphasis on edge orientation also makes it move-efficient, and some of its techniques are used in the Fewest Moves Challenge (FMC).

==== Corners-first methods ====
Corners-first methods involve solving the corners and then finishing the edges with slice turns. Corner-first solutions were common in the 1980s. It was used by the 1982 world champion Minh Thai. Currently, corner-first solutions are rarely used among speedsolvers. Dutch cuber Marc Waterman created a corners-first method in the cube craze and averaged 18 seconds in the mid-late 1980s.

=== Fewest Moves Challenge ===
At the highest level, there is typically not a standard method used for Fewest Moves solving. Rather, competitors attempt to solve the cube intuitively using solving techniques such as Edge Orientation, Ruchy Zupełnie Przypadkowe (Polish for Completely Random Moves), blockbuilding, Normal-Inverse-Scramble-Switch (NISS), commutator insertions, Domino Reduction, and Half Turn Reduction after its rise to popularity in 2019. Most solves use multiple of these techniques in order to generate a solution.

=== Blindfolded ===
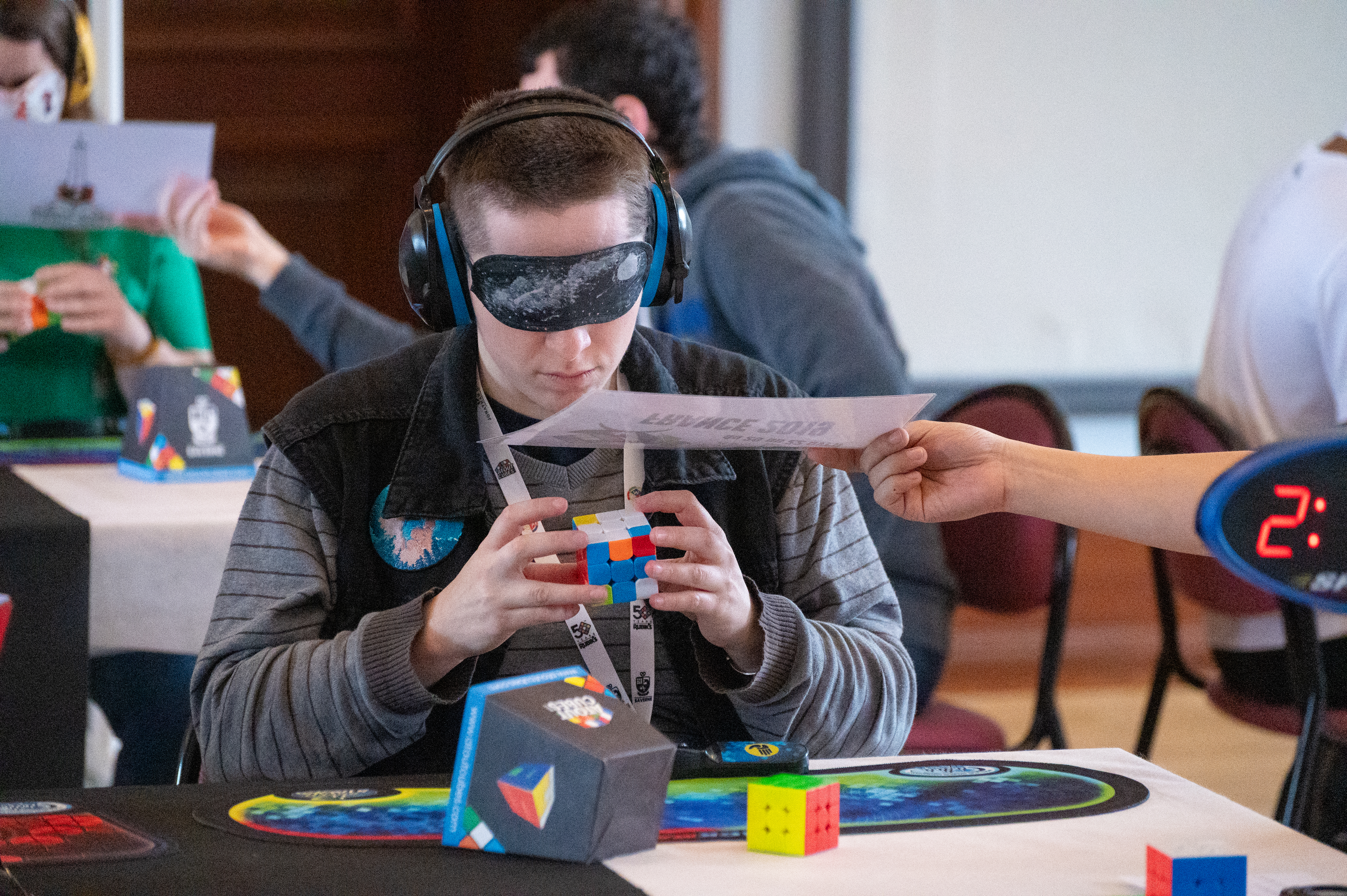
Blindfolded competitor in the solving stage of a competition attempt

In 2003, when the first blindfolded competitions were organized, world record solvers would use the 3OP (3-cycle orientation permutation) method, which orients and then permutes pieces using 3 cycles. As of today, methods such as 3-Style and M2 are among the fastest and most popular blind-solving methods. The Old Pochmann Method, which is a method that solves one piece at a time, is a method typically used by beginner blindsolvers. Blindfolded solvers use letter patterns to help memorize sequences of moves in order to solve the cube.

The lettering scheme that blindfolded solvers use is called the Speffz lettering scheme, and each sticker or individual colour is given a letter. The letters are assigned starting with the top edge of the top face, going clockwise, and beginning with A. The top edge of the top face is A, the right edge is B, the bottom edge is C, and the left edge is D. The same process is done on the other sides in the order top, left, front, right, back, and bottom to get every edge lettered from A to X. The same process is applied to all of the corners, starting with the top left corner and going clockwise in the same face order. A cycle of piece swaps is then used with the letter E being used as a buffer location for corners and D commonly being used for edges in the Old Pochmann method.

As of 2026, the world record single holder is Tommy Cherry with a time of 11.56. The average world record is tied between Charlie Eggins and Tommy Cherry both having achieved a 14.05 average.

== Competitions ==
Speedcubing competitions have been held every year since 2003. The WCA was formed in 2004 to govern all official competitions. For a competition to be official, it must be approved by the WCA and follow the WCA regulations. Included in the regulations is the necessity of having one or more WCA delegates in attendance. A delegate's main role is to ensure all regulations are followed during the competition. Once the competition is finished, results are uploaded to the WCA website. Judges oversee the round, delegates help the judge, runners give the scrambled or solved cube to the competitor/scrambler, and a scrambler scrambles the cube using moves generated by a computer.

=== Format ===
The majority of puzzle competitions are held using a trimmed mean of five, or, as almost all cubers call it, an "Average of 5". This involves the competitor executing five solves in the round in question, after which the fastest and slowest solves are disregarded and the mean of the remaining three is used. The 6×6×6 and 7×7×7 events are ranked by a straight mean of three—only three solves, none of which are disregarded. In 3×3×3 blindfolded and 3×3×3 fewest moves challenges, either a straight mean of 3 or the best of 3 is used, while 4×4×4 blindfolded, 5×5×5 blindfolded, and multiple blindfolded challenges are ranked using the best of 1, 2 or 3, depending on the competition.

When a round begins, competitors turn in the puzzle they will use. Puzzles are scrambled using a computer-generated scramble. In each round, five, three, or one (depending on the format mentioned above) scrambles are used. Every competitor in the round will receive each scramble once. Before starting a solution, a competitor has up to 15 seconds to inspect the puzzle (inspection is removed for blindfolded events). This is monitored by a judge with a stopwatch. Once the solution is complete, the judge records the time on the competitor's scorecard, which is signed by both. If the puzzle is unsolved and the timer is stopped, the time is recorded as either a Plus 2, indicated by +2 on scorecards, and basically adds 2 seconds to your time, or as a "DNF" (Did Not Finish). There are also numerous reasons why the solver can receive a two-second addition to the solve time, such as a face being more than 45 degrees off or the competitor going over the allowed inspection time. A competitor can also receive an extra solution to replace the one just completed, for example in the case of a timer malfunction or a duplicate scramble.

The official timer used in competitions is the StackMat Gen 3, Gen 4 or Gen 5 timer, which was originally designed for sport stacking. This device has touch-sensitive pads that are triggered by the user lifting one or both of their hands to start the time and placing both their hands back on the pads after releasing the puzzle to stop the timer. Starting in 2027, only the Gen 5 timer may be used, which will require not just two hands, but also correct positioning of the thumbs.

Only two WCA recognised events are not "speedsolving" events (i.e. are scored by means other than time taken for solves), these being: Fewest Moves Competition, or FMC, which is scored using the number of moves for a competitor's solution, with a lower number of moves being better, and multiple blindfold solving, or "multi-blind", where a competitor's score is calculated by subtracting the number of unsolved cubes from the number of solved cubes.

Official competitions are currently being held in several categories.

Category	Cube type
Speedsolving	2×2×2, 3×3×3, 4×4×4, 5×5×5, 6×6×6, 7×7×7, Clock, Megaminx, Pyraminx, Skewb, Square-1
Blindfolded solving	3×3×3, 4×4×4, 5×5×5
Multiple cubes blindfolded solving	3×3×3
One-handed solving	3×3×3
Solving in fewest moves	3×3×3

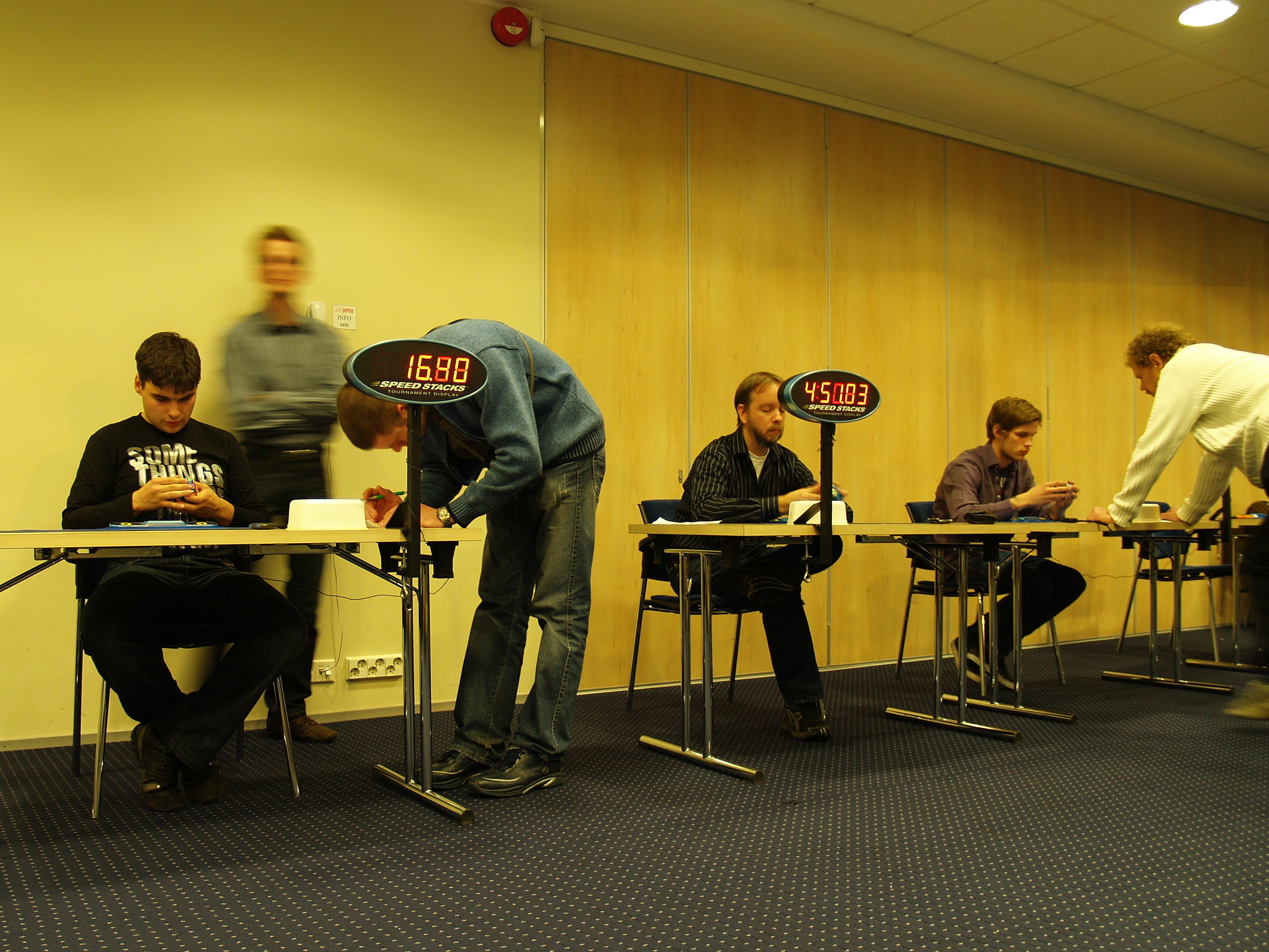
Speedsolvers solving Megaminxes at the 2011 Estonian Open

Competitions will often include events for speedsolving other puzzles as well, such as:

- Pyraminx, a pyramid-shaped puzzle.
- Megaminx, a twelve-sided dodecahedral puzzle solved similarly to a 3×3×3.
- Skewb, a cube-shaped and corner turning puzzle added in 2014 as an official WCA event due to its growing popularity and the ease of its regulations.
- Square-1, a cube puzzle that changes shape as it is solved
- Rubik's Clock is a double-sided, round puzzle with nine clock faces. It is considered solved when all the clock hands point to 12 o’clock. On 24 June 2026, the WCA announced that after the 2027 World Championship, the organization will no longer recognize this puzzle as an official event.

The following are no longer official events:

- 3×3×3 with Feet was removed from the list of official WCA events in 2020.
- The Rubik's Magic, a folding puzzle with 8 connected tiles, was removed from the list of official WCA events in 2012.
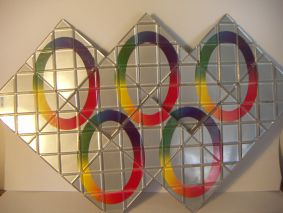
  The Rubik's Master Magic, removed from the list of official WCA events in 2012
- The Rubik's Master Magic, a folding puzzle with 12 connected tiles, was removed from the list of official WCA events in 2012.
- The Rainbow Cube, a cuboctahedron-shaped puzzle, was removed from the list of official WCA events in 2007.
- The Siamese Cube, two connected 3×3s, was removed from the list of official WCA events in 2007.
- 3×3 with No Inspection was removed from the list of official WCA events in 2006.
- 3×3 Multiple Blindfolded Old Style was removed from the list of official WCA events in 2009.

Additionally, starting in 2027, the face turning octahedron (FTO) will be an official event.

=== World Rubik's Cube Championships ===
The WCA sanctions the Rubik's Cube World Championship as the main international competition once every two years. The latest championship was held in Seattle, United States from 3 to 6 July 2025.

Championship	Year	Host	Date(s)	Nations	Competitors	Events	Winner (3×3)	Winning time(s)	Ref
I	1982	(Hungary) Budapest	5 June	19	19	1	(United States) Minh Thai	22.95 (Single)	
II	2003	(Canada) Toronto	23–24 August	15	88	13	(United States) Dan Knights	20.00 (Average)	
III	2005	(United States) Lake Buena Vista	5–6 November	16	149	15	(France) Jean Pons	15.10 (Average)	
IV	2007	(Hungary) Budapest	5–7 October	28	214	17	(Japan) Yu Nakajima	12.46 (Average)	
V	2009	(Germany) Düsseldorf	9–11 October	32	327	19	(United Kingdom) Breandan Vallance	10.74 (Average)	
VI	2011	(Thailand) Bangkok	14–16 October	35	292	19	(Poland) Michał Pleskowicz	8.65 (Average)	
VII	2013	(United States) Las Vegas	26–28 July	35	580	17	(Australia) Feliks Zemdegs	8.18 (Average)	
VIII	2015	(Brazil) São Paulo	17–19 July	37	428	18	(Australia) Feliks Zemdegs	7.56 (Average)	
IX	2017	(France) Paris	13–16 July	64	938	18	(United States) Max Park	6.85 (Average)	
X	2019	(Australia) Melbourne	11–14 July	52	833	18	(Germany) Philipp Weyer	6.74 (Average)	
—	2021	(Netherlands) Almere	Cancelled (Note: Postponed to 28–31 December 2020 and later canceled due to the COVID-19 pandemic.)	—	—	17	—	—	
XI	2023	(South Korea) Incheon	12–15 August	63	1187	17	(United States) Max Park	5.31 (Average)	
XII	2025	(United States) Seattle	3–6 July	74	1864	17	(China) Yiheng Wang	4.23 (Average)	
XIII	2027	(Sweden) Uppsala	22–25 July	TBA	2000	18			

== World Records ==
The following are the official speedcubing world records approved by the WCA as of 21 November 2026.

Note: For averages of 5 solves, the best time and the worst time are dropped, and the mean of the remaining 3 solves is taken. For events where only 3 solves are done, the mean of all 3 is taken. (Times in parentheses are not included in the average calculation)

Event	Type	Result	Person	Competition (Date(s))	Round Results
3x3x3 Cube	Single	2.51	(China) Xuanyi Geng (耿暄一)	Guangzhou Grand Open 2026 (4–5 October 2026)	(2.51) / 3.99 / 3.21 / 4.42 / (4.75)
3x3x3 Cube	Average	3.51	(China) Yiheng Wang (王艺衡)	Hefei Cubing League 3x3 III 2026 (17 June 2026)	3.68 / (4.61) / (3.39) / 3.41 / 3.45
2x2x2 Cube	Single	0.39	(China) Ziyu Ye (叶梓渝)	Hefei Open 2025 (25 October 2025)	(1.94) / 1.31 / 1.38 / 1.46 / (0.39)
2x2x2 Cube	Average	0.86	(United States) Sujan Feist	Kids America Christmas Clash OH 2025 (13 December 2025)	0.86 / 1.02 / (0.56) / (1.42) / 0.70
2x2x2 Cube	Average	0.86	(United States) Sujan Feist	Cubing the Coast MS 2026 (22 August 2026)	0.85 / (2.97) / 0.81 / 0.91 / (0.66)
2x2x2 Cube	Average	0.86	(Poland) Teodor Zajder	Polish Championship 2026 (20-22 November 2026)	0.81 / (0.77) / (1.08) / 0.89 / 0.89
4x4x4 Cube	Single	15.18	(Poland) Tymon Kolasiński	Spanish Championship 2025 (6–8 December 2025)	20.27 / (22.54) / 19.57 / (15.18) / 20.34
4x4x4 Cube	Average	18.46	(Poland) Tymon Kolasiński	Seoul Winter 2026 (17–18 January 2026)	19.16 / 18.01 / 18.51 / (21.64) / (16.09)
5x5x5 Cube	Single	29.49	(Poland) Tymon Kolasiński	All Rounders Katowice I 2026 (1–3 May 2026)	33.43 / (29.49) 33.21 / 34.56 / (35.52)
5x5x5 Cube	Average	32.09	(Russia) Timofei Tarasenko	Guangzhou Grand Open 2026 (4-5 October 2026)	35.42 / 31.87 / (37.15) / (30.90) / 32.28
6x6x6 Cube	Single	57.69	(United States) Max Park	Burbank Big Cubes 2025 (26 April 2025)	57.69 / 1:11.14 / 1:09.39
6x6x6 Cube	Mean	1:06.76	(Russia) Timofei Tarasenko	Beijing Autumn Rivalry 2026 (30–2 October 2026)	1:02.64 / 1:01.63 / 1:01.00
7x7x7 Cube	Single	1:27.47	(Russia) Timofei Tarasenko	Beijing Autumn Rivalry 2026 (30–2 October 2026)	1:37.95 / 1:27.47 / 1:42.37
7x7x7 Cube	Mean	1:35.93	(Russia) Timofei Tarasenko	Beijing Autumn Rivalry 2026 (30–2 October 2026)	1:37.95 / 1:27.47 / 1:42.37
3x3x3 Blindfolded	Single	11.56	(United States) Tommy Cherry	Mid-Atlantic Quiet Championship 2026 (27–28 June 2026)	15.98 / 14.26 / (11.56) / 14.95 / (DNF)
3x3x3 Blindfolded	Mean	13.97	(United States) Tommy Cherry	Hefei August Open 2026 (15 August 2026)	13.68 / 14.48 / (13.60) / 13.75 / (15.87)
3x3x3 Fewest Moves	Single	16	(Italy) Sebastiano Tronto	FMC 2019 (15–16 June 2019)	16 / 26 / 24
3x3x3 Fewest Moves	Single	16	(United States) Aedan Bryant	Ashfield Summer Challenge 2024 (23 June 2024)	26 / 16 / 26
3x3x3 Fewest Moves	Single	16	(United States) Levi Gibson	Ashfield Summer Challenge 2024 (23 June 2024)	26 / 16 / 24
3x3x3 Fewest Moves	Single	16	(United Kingdom) Jacob Sherwen Brown	Rubik's UK Championship FMC 2024 (26 October 2024)	33 / 31 / 16
3x3x3 Fewest Moves	Single	16	(Slovakia) Riccardo Raciti	FMC Italy 2026 (21 November 2026)	DNF / DNF / 16
3x3x3 Fewest Moves	Mean	19.00	(United States) Brian Johnson	Evanston FMC Spring 2026 (2 May 2026)	17 / 18 / 22
3x3x3 One-Handed	Single	5.62	(United States) Patrick Ponce	Mid-Atlantic Speedcubing Championship 2026 (14–16 August 2026)	10.79 / 13.99 / (5.62) / 8.46 / (16.35)
3x3x3 One-Handed	Average	6.99	(China) Zhen Chen (陈震)	Wuhu Open 2026 (25 July 2026)	7.27 / 7.07 / (6.12) / (9.48) / 6.64
Clock	Single	1.53	(New Zealand) Lachlan Gibson	Hasty Hastings 2025 (27 September 2025)	3.52 / 2.33 / (7.02) / (1.53) / 3.08
Clock	Average	2.14	(New Zealand) Lachlan Gibson	GAN New Zealand Nationals 2026 (10-12 July 2026)	2.10 / (2.07) / 2.22 / 2.09 / (2.33)
Megaminx	Single	21.04	(China) Ziyu Wu (吴子钰)	Quanzhou Summer 2026 (30 May 2026)	(21.04) / 27.74 / 28.66 / 26.11 / (29.29)
Megaminx	Average	23.40	(Russia) Timofei Tarasenko	Kuala Lumpur Cubing Challenge 2026 (22-23 August 2026)	(22.47) / (24.29) / 23.57 / 23.73 / 22.91
Pyraminx	Single	0.70	(United States) Clem Tucker	Dobbs Ferry Decathlon 2026 (12-13 November 2026)	1.65 / 1.62 / (4.68) / 1.84 / (0.70)
Pyraminx	Average	1.14	(China) Lingkun Jiang (姜凌坤)	Zhengzhou Zest 2025 (27 December 2025)	1.04 / (3.22) / (0.97) / 1.21 / 1.16
Skewb	Single	0.73	(Czech Republic) Vojtěch Grohmann	Głuszyca Open 2026 (7–8 March 2026)	(3.25) / 1.57 / 1.70 / (0.73) / 1.56
Skewb	Average	1.37	(Poland) Ignacy Samselski	Cube Factory League Justynów 2025 (14–15 June 2025)	1.22 / 1.43 / (1.16) / 1.46 / (2.93)
Square-1	Single	2.85	(United States) Brian Johnson	Evanston Qualifier 2026 (17 May 2026)	(2.85) / 4.39 / (9.36) / 6.40 / 5.23
Square-1	Average	4.63	(United States) Sameer Aggarwal	Cubing in Southern Oregon 2025 (1 February 2025)	(8.08) / 6.20 / (3.42) / 3.81 / 3.88
4x4x4 Blindfolded	Single	51.96	(United States) Stanley Chapel	4BLD in a Madison Hall 2023 (28–29 January 2023)	1:17.62 / DNF / 51.96
4x4x4 Blindfolded	Mean	59.39	(United States) Stanley Chapel	New York Multimate PBQ II 2025 (13–15 June 2025)	57.83 / 1:04.79 / 55.54
5x5x5 Blindfolded	Single	1:58.59	(United States) Stanley Chapel	Multi Mayhem VA 2026 (2–4 January 2026)	2:22.85 / DNF / 1:58.59
5x5x5 Blindfolded	Mean	2:27.63	(United States) Stanley Chapel	Michigan Cubing Club Epsilon 2019 (14 December 2019)	2:32.48 / 2:28.80 / 2:21.62
3x3x3 Multi-Blind	Single	63/65 58:23	(United States) Graham Siggins	Please Be Quiet Reno 2025 (18 October 2025)	63/65 58:23 / 58/68 1:00:00

== See also ==
- Rubik's Revenge
- Professor's Cube
- Magic Cube
