= Rubik's Clock =

Rubik's puzzle

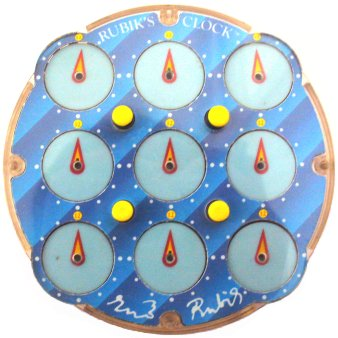
The front face of a solved original Rubik's clock

The Rubik's Clock is a mechanical puzzle invented and patented by Christopher C. Wiggs and Christopher J. Taylor. The Hungarian sculptor and professor of architecture Ernő Rubik bought the patent from them to market the product under his name. It was first marketed in 1988.

The Rubik's Clock is a two-sided puzzle, each side presenting nine clocks. There are four dials, one at each corner of the puzzle, each allowing the corresponding corner clock to be rotated directly. The corner clocks, unlike the other clocks, rotate on both sides of the puzzle simultaneously and can never be operated independently. Thus, the puzzle contains only 14 independent clocks.

There are also four pins which span both sides of the puzzle; each pin arranged such that if it is "in" on one side, it is "out" on the other. The state of each pin (in or out) determines whether the adjacent corner clock is mechanically connected to the three other adjacent clocks on the front side or on the back side: thus the configuration of the pins determines which sets of clocks can be turned simultaneously by rotating a suitable dial.

The aim of the puzzle is to set all nine clocks to 12 o'clock—straight up—on both sides of the puzzle simultaneously. A method to do so is to start by constructing a cross on both sides—at 12 o'clock—and then solving the corner clocks individually. Other viable speedsolving methods have been devised that always solve it in 14 moves or less. An example is the "7-Simul" method, which involves performing seven pairs of moves on the front and back of the clock simultaneously and requires mental calculation from the puzzle's initial position to determine some moves.

The Rubik's Clock is one of the events recognized by the World Cube Association (WCA). On June 24, 2026, the WCA announced they would be removing Rubik's Clock from their selection of events sanctioned at official competitions, citing high proneness to incidents, difficulty of holding the event at competitions, spectator friendliness, and a desire to move the organization's identity away from "mechanical puzzles". The last competition to host the Rubik's Clock will be the WCA World Championship 2027.

== Combinations ==
Since there are 14 independent clocks with 12 settings each, there are a total of 12^{14} = 1,283,918,464,548,864 possible combinations for the clock faces. This does not account for the number of pin positions.

Including pin positions, the total combinations is 12^{14} × 16 = 20,542,695,432,781,824 (approximately 20.5 quadrillion) combinations.

God's number for the Rubik's Clock is 12.

== Notation ==
The puzzle is oriented with 12 o'clock on top, and either side in front. The following moves can be made:

=== Pin movements ===
- UR (top-right): Move the top-right pin up.
- DR (bottom-right): Move the bottom-right pin up.
- DL (bottom-left): Move the bottom-left pin up.
- UL (top-left): Move the top-left pin up.
- U (both top): Move both top pins up.
- R (both right): Move both right pins up.
- D (both bottom): Move both bottom pins up.
- L (both left): Move both left pins up.
- ALL (all): Move all pins up.

=== Wheel movements ===
- X+ (X clockwise turns): Turn a dial next to an up-position pin clockwise X times, then move all pins down.
- X− (X counter-clockwise turns): Turn a dial next to an up-position pin counter-clockwise X times, then move all pins down.

=== Puzzle rotation ===
- y2: Flip the puzzle, then move all pins down.

== Records ==
The world record for a single solve is held by Lachlan Gibson of New Zealand with a time of 1.53 seconds, set at Hasty Hastings 2025 in Hastings, New Zealand.

The world record for the Olympic average of five solves is held by Lachlan Gibson of New Zealand with an average of 2.14 seconds, set at GAN New Zealand Nationals 2026 in Wellington, New Zealand with times of 2.10, (2.07), 2.22, 2.09, and (2.33) seconds.

=== Top 10 solvers by single solve ===
Rank	Name	Result	Competition
1	(New Zealand) Lachlan Gibson	1.53s	(New Zealand) Hasty Hastings 2025
2	(United States) Brendyn Dunagan	1.60s	(United States) Agoura Winter 2026
3	(Australia) Kyle Jones	1.61s	(Australia) Melbourne Summer 2026
4	(United States) Volodymyr Kapustianskyi	1.64s	(United States) Moorhead Madness 2025
5	(Poland) Antoni Stojek	1.74s	(Poland) Cube Factory League Zgierz 2026
6	(Philippines) Karl Abarquez	1.84s	(Philippines) Greenwoods Summer Overtime 2026
7	(United States) Alessandro Diomampo	1.85s	(United States) Agoura Winter 2026
8	(Russia) Anatolii Turenko	1.87s	(Czech Republic) Back to Kostelec 2025
8	(United States) Max McGill	1.87s	(United States) Iowa Championship 2026
10	(Poland) Eryk Kasperek	1.90s	(Poland) Polish Championship 2025

=== Top 10 solvers by Olympic average of 5 solves ===
Rank	Name	Result	Competition	Times
1	(New Zealand) Lachlan Gibson	2.14s	GAN New Zealand Nationals 2026	2.10, (2.07), 2.22, 2.09, (2.33)
2	(United States) Brendyn Dunagan	2.24s	(United States) Temecula Valley Winter 2025	2.02, (3.27), (1.93), 2.27, 2.43
3	(United States) Volodymyr Kapustianskyi	2.26s	(United States) Heartland Championship 2026	2.46, 1.91, (3.32), (1.76), 2.42
4	(United States) Alessandro Diomampo	2.41s	(United States) Mountain House Open 2026	2.46, 2.35, (2.16), (6.45), 2.43
5	(Australia) Kyle Jones	2.42s	(Australia) Melbourne Summer 2026	2.65, (3.70), 2.30, (1.61), 2.32
5	(Poland) Antoni Stojek	2.42s	(Poland) Cube4fun Lublin February 2026	(2.70), 2.35, (2.22), 2.26, 2.64
7	(United States) Fiona Bao	2.44s	(United States) Derwood Cubing Derby Fall 2026	2.38, (2.68), 2.50, 2.44, (2.27)
8	(Poland) Eryk Kasperek	2.52s	(Poland) Cube4fun Lublin on WEII 2024	2.44, (3.36), 2.59, (2.40), 2.52
9	(Philippines) Karl Abarquez	2.55s	(Philippines) Greenwoods Clock Clash 2026	2.71, (4.45), 2.67, 2.27, (1.89)
10	(United States) Ivan ThanhDanh Duong	2.57s	(United States) North Star Cubing Challenge MN 2026	2.72, (2.18),, 2.47, (3.05), 2.51

=== Top 10 single solves ===
Rank	Name	Result	Competition
1	(New Zealand) Lachlan Gibson	1.53s	(New Zealand) Hasty Hastings 2025
2	(United States) Brendyn Dunagan	1.60s	(United States) Agoura Winter 2026
3	(Australia) Kyle Jones	1.61s	(Australia) Melbourne Summer 2026
4	(United States) Volodymyr Kapustianskyi	1.64s	(United States) Moorhead Madness 2025
5	(United States) Brendyn Dunagan	1.70s	(United States) Georgia Championship 2026
6	(New Zealand) Lachlan Gibson	1.74s	New Zealand Cubing Decathlon 2025
6	(Poland) Antoni Stojek	1.74s	(Poland) Cube Factory League Zgierz 2026
8	(United States) Volodymyr Kapustianskyi	1.76s	(United States) Heartland Championship 2026
9	(United States) Brendyn Dunagan	1.77s	(United States) Agoura Winter 2026
10	(Australia) Kyle Jones	1.78s	(Australia) Richmond Clock Clash 2026

=== Top 10 Olympic averages of 5 solves ===
Rank	Name	Result	Competition	Times
1	(New Zealand) Lachlan Gibson	2.14s	GAN New Zealand Nationals 2026	2.10, (2.07), 2.22, 2.09, (2.33)
2	(United States) Brendyn Dunagan	2.24s	(United States) Temecula Valley Winter 2025	2.02, (3.27), (1.93), 2.27, 2.43
3	(New Zealand) Lachlan Gibson	2.26s	(New Zealand) 2x2 in Tāmaki Makaurau 2025	2.27, (1.82), (3.01), 2.26, 2.24
3	(United States) Volodymyr Kapustianskyi	2.26s	(United States) Heartland Championship 2026	2.46, 1.91, (3.32), (1.76), 2.42
5	(United States) Brendyn Dunagan	2.27s	(United States) Agoura Winter 2026	2.07, 1.97, (1.60), (DNF), 2.77
6	(New Zealand) Lachlan Gibson	2.28s	(New Zealand) Puzzling Papatoetoe 2025	(2.20), 2.22, 2.26, 2.36, (2.65)
7	(New Zealand) Lachlan Gibson	2.29s	(New Zealand) Milford Winter Warm Up 2025	(4.34), 2.57, 2.08, (1.87), 2.21
8	(New Zealand) Lachlan Gibson	2.30s	New Zealand Cubing Decathlon 2025	1.98, 2.16, 2.77, (2.93), (1.74)
9	(United States) Volodymyr Kapustianskyi	2.31s	(United States) Moorhead Madness 2025	2.35, 2.40, 2.18, (3.71), (1.64)
10	(New Zealand) Lachlan Gibson	2.32s	GAN New Zealand Nationals 2026	(2.53), 2.43, 2.36, (1.90), 2.18

=== Non-human solving ===
On Nov 21, 2024, a robot developed by Erez Borenshtein achieved a Guinness World Record by solving a Rubik's Clock in 0.443 seconds. This accomplishment was officially recognized by Guinness World Record as the fastest time for a robot to solve a Rubik's Clock. The record is documented on the Guinness World Records website.
