= Jessica Fridrich =

Czech professor (born 1963 or 1964)

- Born: 1963 or 1964 (age 61–62)
- Education: FNSPE CTU (till 1987), Binghamton University (till 1995)
- Occupation: Electrical engineering professor
- Known for: Popularizing the CFOP method for speed-solving the Rubik's Cube

Jessica Fridrich is a professor at Binghamton University, who specializes in data hiding applications in digital imagery. She is also known for documenting and popularizing the CFOP method (also known as the "Fridrich method"), one of the most commonly used methods for speedsolving the Rubik's Cube, also known as speedcubing. She is considered one of the pioneers of speedcubing, along with Lars Petrus. Nearly all of the fastest speedcubers have based their methods on Fridrich's, usually referred to as CFOP, that is, Cross, First 2 Layers, Orientation of the Last Layer and Permutation of the Last Layer.

The method describes solving the cube in a layer-by-layer fashion. First a "cross" is made on the first layer, consisting of the center piece and four edges (Cross). Next, the first layer's corners and edges of the second layer are put into their correct positions simultaneously in pairs (F2L). The last layer is solved by first orienting the yellow pieces (OLL) and then permuting the last layer of the cube using a few sets of algorithms (PLL).

== Speedcubing ==
At the age of 16, in March 1981, Fridrich saw a Rubik's Cube for the first time. These cubes weren't immediately purchasable in the context of communist Czechoslovakia. However, Fridrich managed to obtain one in July when a French family visiting the area brought it along. Following the acquisition of the Cube, Fridrich delved into learning a Layer by Layer technique from a Czech publication. By the time September rolled around, she had reached an average solving time of roughly 1 minute.

In May 1982, the national championship occurred, coinciding with Fridrich's average solve time hovering at approximately 25 seconds. Out of the participants, five cubers, including Mirek Goljan, advanced to the finals. In this arena, Fridrich clinched victory in both the initial and second rounds, whereas Goljan secured the triumph in the third and final round. The specific time of 23.55 seconds during the second round paved the way for Fridrich to secure the top spot. She competed in Rubik's Cube World Championship in Budapest in 1982 in which she finished 10th with the best time of 29.11 seconds

== Career ==
Jessica Fridrich works as a professor at the Department of Electrical and Computer Engineering at Binghamton University and specializes in digital watermarking and forensics. She received her MS degree in applied mathematics from the Czech Technical University in Prague in 1987, and her PhD in systems science from Binghamton University in 1995. In 2018, Fridrich was elected a fellow of the National Academy of Inventors.
