= Pocket Cube =

2x2x2 combination puzzle

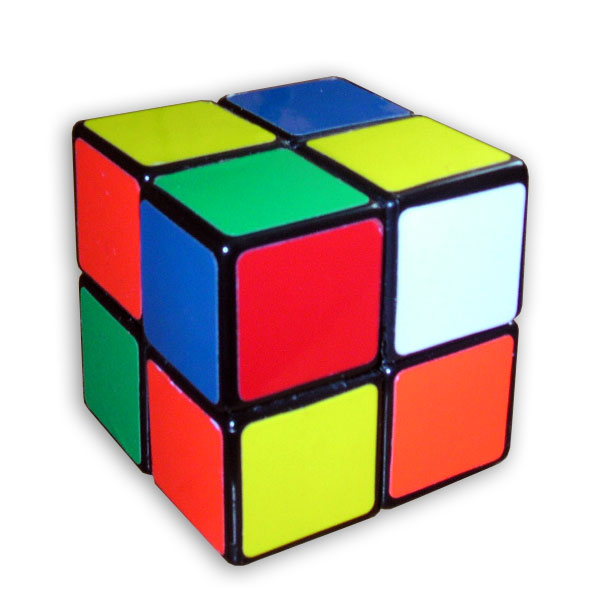
A scrambled Pocket Cube (having the Japanese color scheme)

The Pocket Cube (also known as the 2×2×2 Rubik's Cube, Mini Cube or simply just 2x2 Rubik's Cube for short.) is a 2×2×2 combination puzzle invented in 1970 by American puzzle designer Larry D. Nichols. The cube consists of 8 external pieces, which are all corners.

== History ==
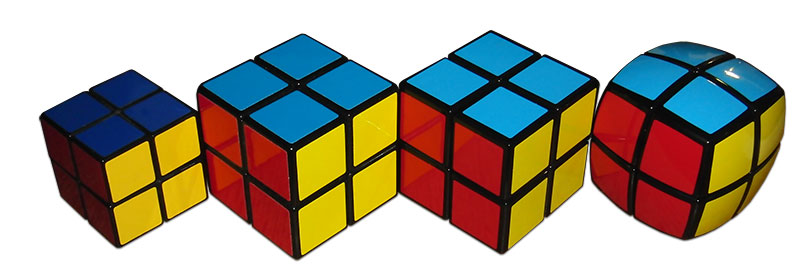
Solved versions of, from left to right: original Pocket Cube, Eastsheen cube, V-Cube 2, V-Cube 2b

In February 1970, Larry D. Nichols invented a 2×2×2 "Puzzle with Pieces Rotatable in Groups" and filed a Canadian patent application for it. Nichols's cube was held together with magnets. Nichols was granted U.S. patent 3,655,201 on April 11, 1972, two years before Rubik invented the 3×3×3 cube.

Nichols assigned his patent to his employer Moleculon Research Corp., which sued Ideal in 1982. In 1984, Ideal lost the patent infringement suit and appealed. In 1986, the appeals court affirmed the judgment that Rubik's 2×2×2 Pocket Cube infringed Nichols's patent, but overturned the judgment on Rubik's 3×3×3 Cube.

== Notation ==
Notation is based on Singmaster notation. Since turning a layer is functionally equivalent to turning the opposite layer in the opposite direction followed by a cube rotation, only three letters are necessary to represent every possible turn:

- R represents a clockwise turn of the right face of the cube
- U represents a clockwise turn of the top face of the cube
- F represents a clockwise turn of the front face of the cube
- R' represents an anti-clockwise turn of the right face of the cube
- U' represents an anti-clockwise turn of the top face of the cube
- F' represents an anti-clockwise turn of the front face of the cube
- R2 represents a 180-degree turn of the right face of the cube
- U2 represents a 180-degree turn of the top face of the cube
- F2 represents a 180-degree turn of the front face of the cube

== Methods ==
A pocket cube can be solved with the same methods as a 3×3×3 Rubik's Cube, simply by treating it as a 3×3×3 with solved (invisible) centers and edges. More advanced methods combine multiple steps and require more algorithms. These algorithms designed for solving a 2×2×2 cube are often significantly shorter and faster than the algorithms one would use for solving a 3×3×3 cube.

The Ortega method, also called the Varasano method, is an intermediate method. First a face is built (but the pieces may be permuted incorrectly), then the last layer is oriented (OLL) and lastly both layers are permuted (PBL). The Ortega method requires a total of 12 algorithms.

The CLL method first builds a layer (with correct permutation) and then solves the second layer in one step by using one of 42 algorithms. A more advanced version of CLL is the TCLL Method also known as Twisty CLL. One layer is built with correct permutation similarly to normal CLL, however one corner piece can be incorrectly oriented. The rest of the cube is solved, and the incorrect corner orientated in one step. There are 83 cases for TCLL.

One of the more advanced methods is the EG method. It starts by building a face like in the Ortega method, but then solves the rest of the puzzle in one step. It requires knowing 128 algorithms, 42 of which are the CLL algorithms.

Top-level speedcubers may also 1-look the puzzle, which involves inspecting the entire cube and planning out the entire solution in the 15 seconds of inspection allotted to the solver before the solve, with the best solvers being able to plan more than one solution, considering movecount and ergonomics of each.

== Group Theory ==
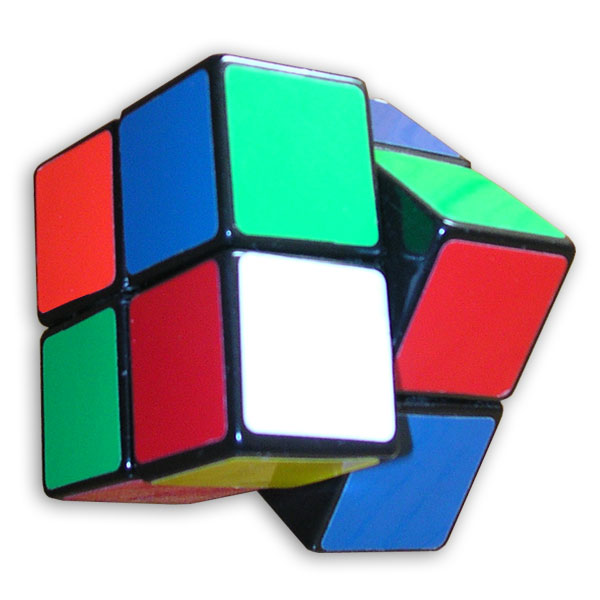
Scrambled Pocket Cube with one layer partially turned

The group theory of the 3×3×3 cube can be transferred to the 2×2×2 cube. The elements of the group are typically the moves of that can be executed on the cube (both individual rotations of layers and composite moves from several rotations) and the group operator is a concatenation of the moves.

To analyse the group of the 2×2×2 cube, the cube configuration has to be determined. This can be represented as a 2-tuple, which is made up of the following parameters:

- Position of the corner pieces as a bijective function (permutation)
- Orientation of the corner pieces as vector x

Two moves $M_1$and $M_2$ from the set $A_M$of all moves are considered equal if they produce the same configuration with the same initial configuration of the cube. With the 2×2×2 cube, it must also be considered that there is no fixed orientation or top side of the cube, because the 2×2×2 cube has no fixed center pieces. Therefore, the equivalence relation $\sim$ is introduced with $M_1 \sim M_2 := M_1$ and $M_2$ result in the same cube configuration (with optional rotation of the cube). This relation is reflexive, as two identical moves transform the cube into the same final configuration with the same initial configuration. In addition, the relation is symmetrical and transitive, as it is similar to the mathematical relation of equality.

With this equivalence relation, equivalence classes can be formed that are defined with $[ M ] := \{ M' \in A_M | M' \sim M \} \subseteq A_M$ on the set of all moves $A_M$. Accordingly, each equivalence class $[M]$ contains all moves of the set $A_M$ that are equivalent to the move with the equivalence relation. $[M]$ is a subset of $A_M$. All equivalent elements of an equivalence class $[M]$ are the representatives of its equivalence class.

The quotient set $A_M / \sim$ can be formed using these equivalence classes. It contains the equivalence classes of all cube moves without containing the same moves twice. The elements of $A_M / \sim$ are all equivalence classes with regard to the equivalence relation $\sim$. The following therefore applies: $A_M / \sim := \{ [M] | M \in A_M \}$. This quotient set is the set of the group of the cube.

The 2×2×2 Rubik's Cube, has eight permutation objects (corner pieces), three possible orientations of the eight corner pieces and 24 possible rotations of the cube, as there is no unique top side.

Any permutation of the eight corners is possible (8! positions), and seven of them can be independently rotated with three possible orientations (3^{7} positions). There is nothing identifying the orientation of the cube in space, reducing the positions by a factor of 24. This is because all 24 possible positions and orientations of the first corner are equivalent due to the lack of fixed centers (similar to what happens in circular permutations). This factor does not appear when calculating the permutations of N×N×N cubes where N is odd, since those puzzles have fixed centers which identify the cube's spatial orientation. The number of possible positions of the cube is

$\frac{8! \times 3^7}{24}=7! \times 3^6=3,674,160.$ This is the order of the group as well.

The largest order of an element in this group is 45. For example, one such element of order 45 is

$$(UR^2L')$$.

Any cube configuration can be solved in up to 14 turns (when making only quarter turns) or in up to 11 turns (when making half turns in addition to quarter turns).

The number a of positions that require n any (half or quarter) turns and number q of positions that require n quarter turns only are:

n	a	q	a(%)	q(%)
0	1	1	0.000027%	0.000027%
1	9	6	0.00024%	0.00016%
2	54	27	0.0015%	0.00073%
3	321	120	0.0087%	0.0033%
4	1847	534	0.050%	0.015%
5	9992	2256	0.27%	0.061%
6	50136	8969	1.36%	0.24%
7	227536	33058	6.19%	0.90%
8	870072	114149	23.68%	3.11%
9	1887748	360508	51.38%	9.81%
10	623800	930588	16.98%	25.33%
11	2644	1350852	0.072%	36.77%
12	0	782536	0%	21.3%
13	0	90280	0%	2.46%
14	0	276	0%	0.0075%

The two-generator subgroup (the number of positions generated just by rotations of two adjacent faces) is of order 29,160.

Code that generates these results can be found here.

=== Number of Unique States ===
Here is a table of the number of unique states at each depth under different degrees of symmetry reduction, with one corner fixed. In 6-fold symmetry, the location of the fixed corner is preserved and allows mirrors. In 24-fold symmetry, all reorientations of the cube are allowed, but not mirrors. In 48-fold symmetry, all reorientations of the cube are allowed, including mirrors.

depth	no symmetry	6-fold symmetry	24-fold symmetry	48-fold symmetry
0	1	1	1	1
1	9	2	3	2
2	54	9	9	5
3	321	54	36	19
4	1847	309	132	68
5	9992	1670	529	271
6	50136	8361	2276	1148
7	227536	37943	9768	4915
8	870072	145046	36582	18364
9	1887748	314710	79006	39707
10	623800	104076	26137	13225
11	2644	449	129	77
Total	3674160	612630	154608	77802

== World records ==
The world record for single solve is 0.39 seconds, set by Ziyu Ye (叶梓渝) of China at Hefei Open 2025 on October 25, 2025.

The world record for average of 5 solves (excluding fastest and slowest) is 0.86 seconds, set two times by Sujan Feist of the United States and also tied with Teodor Zajder from Poland at Kids America Christmas Clash OH 2025 with times of 0.86, 1.02, (0.56), (1.42), and 0.70 seconds; at Cubing the Coast MS 2026 with times of 0.85, (2.97), 0.81, 0.91, and (0.66) seconds; and at Polish Championship 2026 with times of 0.81, (0.77), (1.08), 0.89, and 0.89 seconds.

=== Top 10 solvers by single solve ===
Rank	Name	Result	Competition
1	(China) Ziyu Ye (叶梓渝)	0.39s	(China) Hefei Open 2025
2	(China) Yuki Gao	0.40s	New Zealand Cubing Decathlon 2026
3	(Hong Kong) Sky Guo (郭建欣)	0.41s	(China) Hefei Open 2025
3	(China) Jiazhou Li (李佳洲)	0.41s	(China) Beijing Winter 2026
5	(Poland) Teodor Zajder	0.43s	(Poland) Warsaw Cube Masters 2023
6	(Georgia (country)) Vako Marchilashvili (ვაკო მარჩილაშვილი)	0.44s	(Georgia (country)) Tbilisi April Open 2024
7	(China) Tian Xia (夏天)	0.45s	(China) Hefei Open 2025
7	(China) Yiheng Wang (王艺衡)	0.45s	(China) Beijing Winter 2026
7	(Poland) Szymon Brągiel	0.45s	(Poland) All Rounders Katowice I 2026
10	(New Zealand) Connor Johnson	0.47s	(New Zealand) Queenspark O'Clock 2025
10	(China) Guanbo Wang (王冠博)	0.47s	(Australia) Northside Spring Saturday 2022
10	(Spain) Aitor Ibañez Larrea	0.47s	(Spain) Gares Open 2026
10	(Australia) Roman Rudakov	0.47s	(Australia) Belgrave Open 2026

=== Top 10 solvers by Olympic average of 5 solves ===
Rank	Name	Result	Competition	Times
1	(United States) Sujan Feist	0.86s	(United States) Kids America Christmas Clash OH 2025	0.86, 1.02, (0.56), (1.42), 0.70
1	(United States) Sujan Feist	0.86s	(United States) Cubing the Coast MS 2026	0.85, (2.97), 0.81, 0.91, (0.66)
1	(Poland) Teodor Zajder	0.86s	(Poland) Polish Championship 2026	0.81, (0.77), (1.08), 0.89, 0.89
3	(China) Yiheng Wang (王艺衡)	0.88s	(China) Hangzhou Open 2024	(1.26), (0.84), 0.91, 0.89, 0.85
4	(Singapore) Nigel Phang	0.90s	Singapore Skewby March 2025	0.80, 1.05, (1.17), 0.85, (0.72)
5	(United States) Zayn Khanani	0.92s	(United States) New-Cumberland County 2024	0.84, (2.69), (0.71), 1.04, 0.88
6	(Netherlands) Antonie Paterakis	0.97s	(Spain) Warm Up Portugalete 2024	0.93, 1.05, (0.66), (1.43), 0.92
7	(New Zealand) Seth Nasol	0.98s	(New Zealand) Christchurch Winter 2026	0.93, 0.83, 1.17, (0.73), (1.25)
8	(Spain) Aitor Ibañez Larrea	0.99s	(Spain) Sarriguren Open 2026	0.84, (0.80), 1.10, 1.03, (2.93)
9	(United Kingdom) Max Tully	1.00s	(United Kingdom) Stevenage July 2025	(1.35), (0.91), 1.10, 0.99, 0.91
10	(Sweden) Emanuel Schelin	1.01s	(Sweden) Alekuben 2026	(0.81), 1.11, 0.85, 1.07, (DNF)
10	(Australia) Roman Rudakov	1.01s	(Australia) Belgrave Open 2026	0.97, 0.89, 1.18, (0.88), (DNF)
10	(China) Hansen Yu (余翰森)	1.01s	(China) Beijing Autumn Rivalry 2026	1.09, 0.98, (1.12), (0.90), 0.95

== See also ==
- Rubik's Cube (3×3×3)
- Rubik's Revenge (4×4×4)
- Megaminx
- Professor's Cube (5×5×5)
- V-Cube 6 (6×6×6)
- V-Cube 7 (7×7×7)
- V-Cube 8 (8×8×8)
