= List of world records in speedcubing =

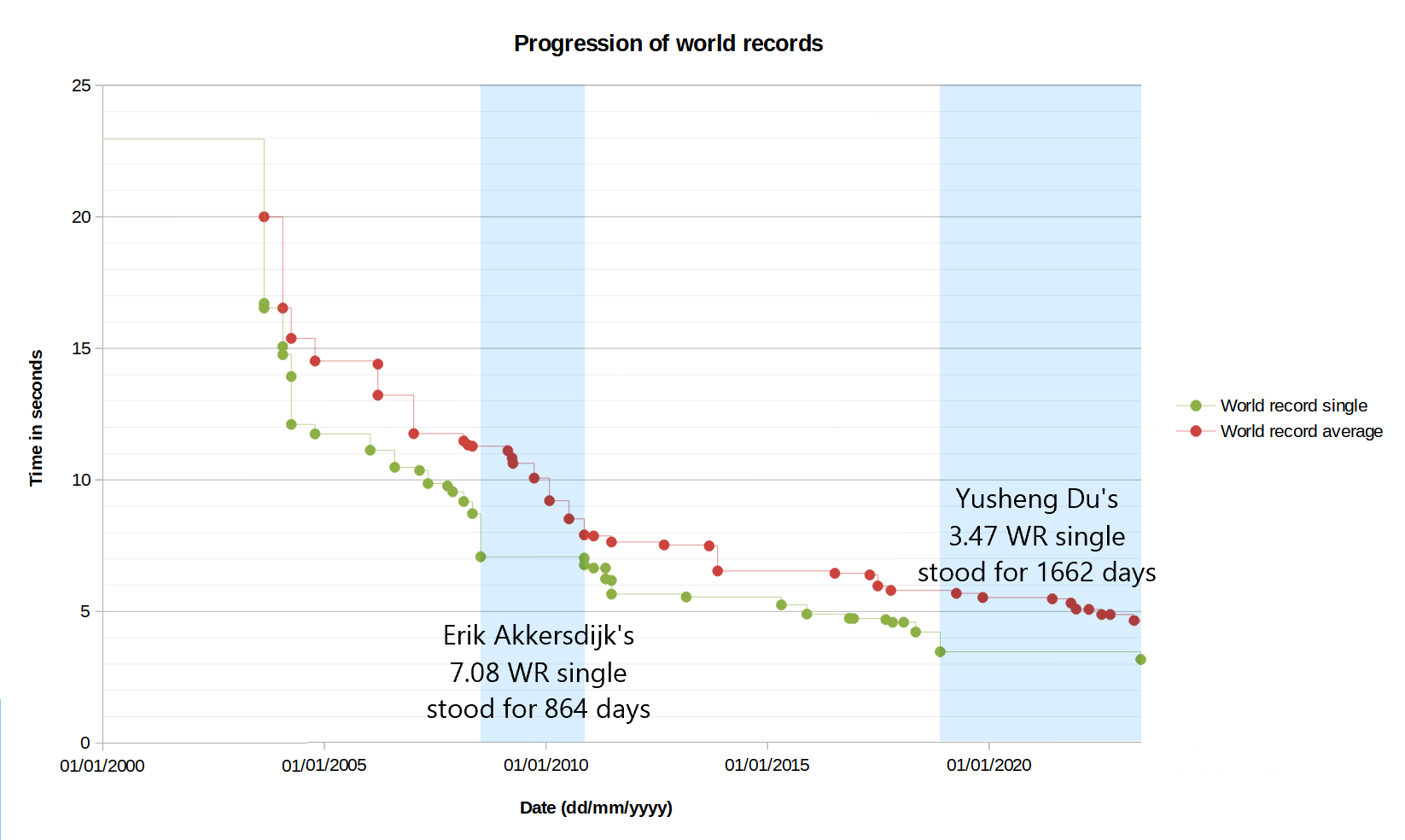
World record progression of the 3x3x3 single and average

World records in speedcubing are ratified by the World Cube Association (WCA). The WCA ratifies records in 17 events. All events except 3x3x3 multi-blind have two categories: single and average.

For most events, an average of five is taken, but for 6x6x6, 7x7x7, 3x3x3 fewest moves, 4x4x4 blindfolded and 5x5x5 blindfolded, a mean of three is taken. For averages of five solves, the best time and the worst time are dropped (Shown in parentheses), and the mean of the remaining three solves is taken. For averages of three solves, the mean of all three is taken.

== World Records ==
The following are the official speedcubing world records approved by the WCA as of 21 November 2026.

Note: For averages of 5 solves, the best time and the worst time are dropped, and the mean of the remaining 3 solves is taken. For events where only 3 solves are done, the mean of all 3 is taken. (Times in parentheses are not included in the average calculation)

Event	Type	Result	Person	Competition (Date(s))	Round Results
3x3x3 Cube	Single	2.51	(China) Xuanyi Geng (耿暄一)	Guangzhou Grand Open 2026 (4–5 October 2026)	(2.51) / 3.99 / 3.21 / 4.42 / (4.75)
3x3x3 Cube	Average	3.51	(China) Yiheng Wang (王艺衡)	Hefei Cubing League 3x3 III 2026 (17 June 2026)	3.68 / (4.61) / (3.39) / 3.41 / 3.45
2x2x2 Cube	Single	0.39	(China) Ziyu Ye (叶梓渝)	Hefei Open 2025 (25 October 2025)	(1.94) / 1.31 / 1.38 / 1.46 / (0.39)
2x2x2 Cube	Average	0.86	(United States) Sujan Feist	Kids America Christmas Clash OH 2025 (13 December 2025)	0.86 / 1.02 / (0.56) / (1.42) / 0.70
2x2x2 Cube	Average	0.86	(United States) Sujan Feist	Cubing the Coast MS 2026 (22 August 2026)	0.85 / (2.97) / 0.81 / 0.91 / (0.66)
2x2x2 Cube	Average	0.86	(Poland) Teodor Zajder	Polish Championship 2026 (20-22 November 2026)	0.81 / (0.77) / (1.08) / 0.89 / 0.89
4x4x4 Cube	Single	15.18	(Poland) Tymon Kolasiński	Spanish Championship 2025 (6–8 December 2025)	20.27 / (22.54) / 19.57 / (15.18) / 20.34
4x4x4 Cube	Average	18.46	(Poland) Tymon Kolasiński	Seoul Winter 2026 (17–18 January 2026)	19.16 / 18.01 / 18.51 / (21.64) / (16.09)
5x5x5 Cube	Single	29.49	(Poland) Tymon Kolasiński	All Rounders Katowice I 2026 (1–3 May 2026)	33.43 / (29.49) 33.21 / 34.56 / (35.52)
5x5x5 Cube	Average	32.09	(Russia) Timofei Tarasenko	Guangzhou Grand Open 2026 (4-5 October 2026)	35.42 / 31.87 / (37.15) / (30.90) / 32.28
6x6x6 Cube	Single	57.69	(United States) Max Park	Burbank Big Cubes 2025 (26 April 2025)	57.69 / 1:11.14 / 1:09.39
6x6x6 Cube	Mean	1:06.76	(Russia) Timofei Tarasenko	Beijing Autumn Rivalry 2026 (30–2 October 2026)	1:02.64 / 1:01.63 / 1:01.00
7x7x7 Cube	Single	1:27.47	(Russia) Timofei Tarasenko	Beijing Autumn Rivalry 2026 (30–2 October 2026)	1:37.95 / 1:27.47 / 1:42.37
7x7x7 Cube	Mean	1:35.93	(Russia) Timofei Tarasenko	Beijing Autumn Rivalry 2026 (30–2 October 2026)	1:37.95 / 1:27.47 / 1:42.37
3x3x3 Blindfolded	Single	11.56	(United States) Tommy Cherry	Mid-Atlantic Quiet Championship 2026 (27–28 June 2026)	15.98 / 14.26 / (11.56) / 14.95 / (DNF)
3x3x3 Blindfolded	Mean	13.97	(United States) Tommy Cherry	Hefei August Open 2026 (15 August 2026)	13.68 / 14.48 / (13.60) / 13.75 / (15.87)
3x3x3 Fewest Moves	Single	16	(Italy) Sebastiano Tronto	FMC 2019 (15–16 June 2019)	16 / 26 / 24
3x3x3 Fewest Moves	Single	16	(United States) Aedan Bryant	Ashfield Summer Challenge 2024 (23 June 2024)	26 / 16 / 26
3x3x3 Fewest Moves	Single	16	(United States) Levi Gibson	Ashfield Summer Challenge 2024 (23 June 2024)	26 / 16 / 24
3x3x3 Fewest Moves	Single	16	(United Kingdom) Jacob Sherwen Brown	Rubik's UK Championship FMC 2024 (26 October 2024)	33 / 31 / 16
3x3x3 Fewest Moves	Single	16	(Slovakia) Riccardo Raciti	FMC Italy 2026 (21 November 2026)	DNF / DNF / 16
3x3x3 Fewest Moves	Mean	19.00	(United States) Brian Johnson	Evanston FMC Spring 2026 (2 May 2026)	17 / 18 / 22
3x3x3 One-Handed	Single	5.62	(United States) Patrick Ponce	Mid-Atlantic Speedcubing Championship 2026 (14–16 August 2026)	10.79 / 13.99 / (5.62) / 8.46 / (16.35)
3x3x3 One-Handed	Average	6.99	(China) Zhen Chen (陈震)	Wuhu Open 2026 (25 July 2026)	7.27 / 7.07 / (6.12) / (9.48) / 6.64
Clock	Single	1.53	(New Zealand) Lachlan Gibson	Hasty Hastings 2025 (27 September 2025)	3.52 / 2.33 / (7.02) / (1.53) / 3.08
Clock	Average	2.14	(New Zealand) Lachlan Gibson	GAN New Zealand Nationals 2026 (10-12 July 2026)	2.10 / (2.07) / 2.22 / 2.09 / (2.33)
Megaminx	Single	21.04	(China) Ziyu Wu (吴子钰)	Quanzhou Summer 2026 (30 May 2026)	(21.04) / 27.74 / 28.66 / 26.11 / (29.29)
Megaminx	Average	23.40	(Russia) Timofei Tarasenko	Kuala Lumpur Cubing Challenge 2026 (22-23 August 2026)	(22.47) / (24.29) / 23.57 / 23.73 / 22.91
Pyraminx	Single	0.70	(United States) Clem Tucker	Dobbs Ferry Decathlon 2026 (12-13 November 2026)	1.65 / 1.62 / (4.68) / 1.84 / (0.70)
Pyraminx	Average	1.14	(China) Lingkun Jiang (姜凌坤)	Zhengzhou Zest 2025 (27 December 2025)	1.04 / (3.22) / (0.97) / 1.21 / 1.16
Skewb	Single	0.73	(Czech Republic) Vojtěch Grohmann	Głuszyca Open 2026 (7–8 March 2026)	(3.25) / 1.57 / 1.70 / (0.73) / 1.56
Skewb	Average	1.37	(Poland) Ignacy Samselski	Cube Factory League Justynów 2025 (14–15 June 2025)	1.22 / 1.43 / (1.16) / 1.46 / (2.93)
Square-1	Single	2.85	(United States) Brian Johnson	Evanston Qualifier 2026 (17 May 2026)	(2.85) / 4.39 / (9.36) / 6.40 / 5.23
Square-1	Average	4.63	(United States) Sameer Aggarwal	Cubing in Southern Oregon 2025 (1 February 2025)	(8.08) / 6.20 / (3.42) / 3.81 / 3.88
4x4x4 Blindfolded	Single	51.96	(United States) Stanley Chapel	4BLD in a Madison Hall 2023 (28–29 January 2023)	1:17.62 / DNF / 51.96
4x4x4 Blindfolded	Mean	59.39	(United States) Stanley Chapel	New York Multimate PBQ II 2025 (13–15 June 2025)	57.83 / 1:04.79 / 55.54
5x5x5 Blindfolded	Single	1:58.59	(United States) Stanley Chapel	Multi Mayhem VA 2026 (2–4 January 2026)	2:22.85 / DNF / 1:58.59
5x5x5 Blindfolded	Mean	2:27.63	(United States) Stanley Chapel	Michigan Cubing Club Epsilon 2019 (14 December 2019)	2:32.48 / 2:28.80 / 2:21.62
3x3x3 Multi-Blind	Single	63/65 58:23	(United States) Graham Siggins	Please Be Quiet Reno 2025 (18 October 2025)	63/65 58:23 / 58/68 1:00:00
