= Feliks Zemdegs =

Australian speedcuber (born 1995)

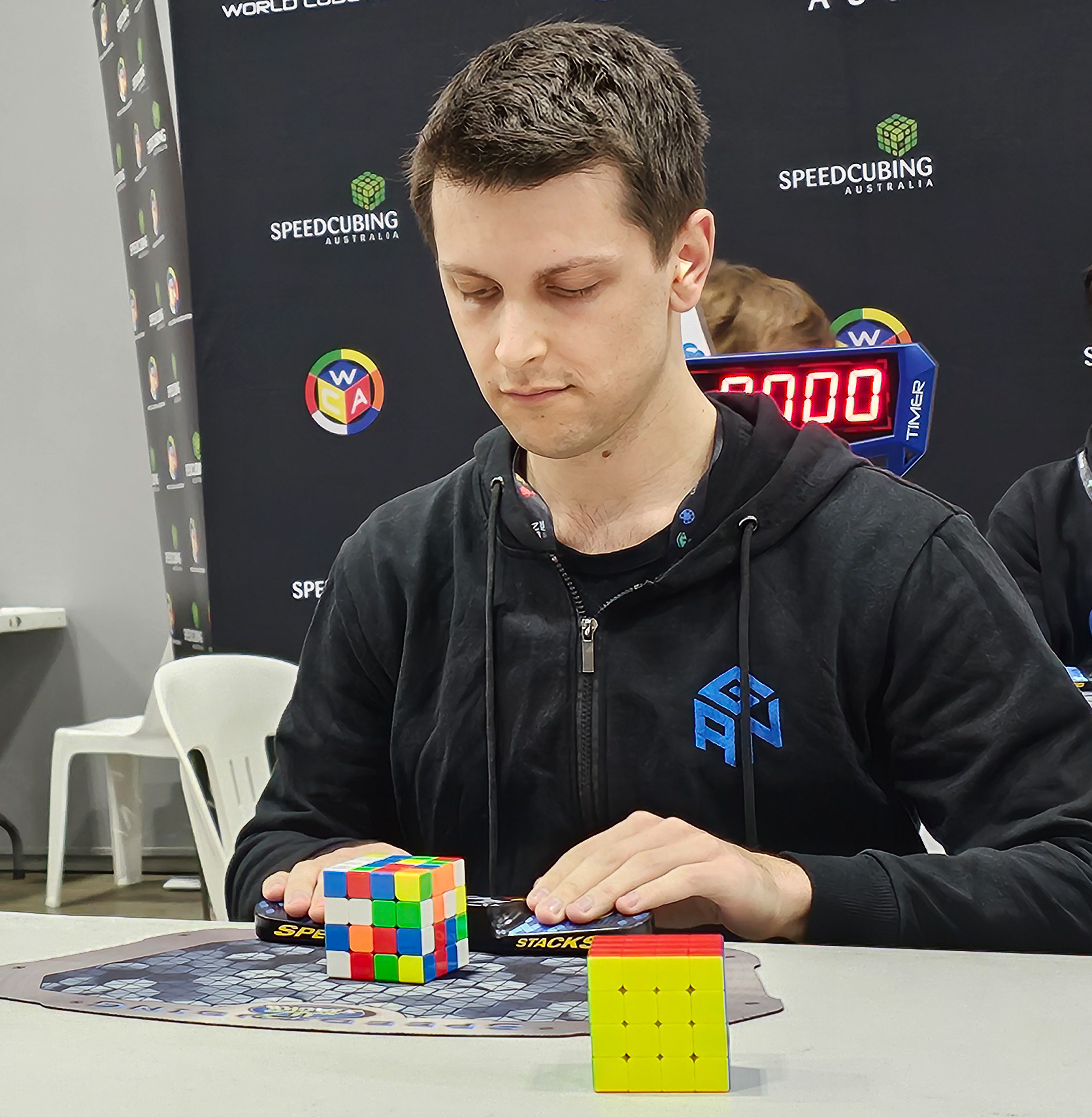
- Zemdegs in March 2024
- Born: Feliks Aleksanders Zemdegs; 20 December 1995 (age 30); Melbourne, Victoria, Australia
- Other name: Faz
- Known for: Speedcubing
Medal record
Representing Australia
Speedcubing
WCA World Championship
Event	1st	2nd	3rd
3×3×3	2	0	1
2×2×2	2	0	0
4×4×4	3	0	1
5×5×5	3	1	1
6×6×6	1	2	0
7×7×7	1	1	2
3×3×3 One-Handed	2	1	0
Megaminx	0	2	0
Total	14	7	5
Gold medal – first place	2011 Bangkok	2×2×2
Gold medal – first place	2011 Bangkok	4×4×4
Gold medal – first place	2011 Bangkok	5×5×5
Gold medal – first place	2011 Bangkok	6×6×6
Gold medal – first place	2013 Las Vegas	3×3×3
Gold medal – first place	2013 Las Vegas	4×4×4
Gold medal – first place	2013 Las Vegas	3×3×3 One-Handed
Gold medal – first place	2015 São Paulo	3×3×3
Gold medal – first place	2015 São Paulo	2×2×2
Gold medal – first place	2015 São Paulo	4×4×4
Gold medal – first place	2015 São Paulo	5×5×5
Gold medal – first place	2015 São Paulo	3×3×3 One-Handed
Gold medal – first place	2017 Paris	5×5×5
Gold medal – first place	2017 Paris	7×7×7
Silver medal – second place	2013 Las Vegas	5×5×5
Silver medal – second place	2015 São Paulo	6×6×6
Silver medal – second place	2015 São Paulo	7×7×7
Silver medal – second place	2015 São Paulo	Megaminx
Silver medal – second place	2017 Paris	6×6×6
Silver medal – second place	2017 Paris	3×3×3 One-Handed
Silver medal – second place	2017 Paris	Megaminx
Bronze medal – third place	2011 Bangkok	3×3×3
Bronze medal – third place	2011 Bangkok	7×7×7
Bronze medal – third place	2013 Las Vegas	7×7×7
Bronze medal – third place	2017 Paris	4×4×4
Bronze medal – third place	2019 Melbourne	5×5×5
Red Bull Rubik's Cube World Cup
Gold medal – first place	2018 Boston	Speedcubing
Silver medal – second place	2019 Moscow	3×3×3 One-Handed
Silver medal – second place	2020	Speedcubing
WCA Oceanic Championships
Gold medal – first place	2022 Melbourne	4×4×4
Gold medal – first place	2022 Melbourne	5×5×5
Gold medal – first place	2022 Melbourne	6×6×6
Gold medal – first place	2022 Melbourne	7×7×7
Silver medal – second place	2022 Melbourne	3×3×3
Silver medal – second place	2022 Melbourne	Megaminx
Bronze medal – third place	2022 Melbourne	3×3×3 One-Handed

Feliks Aleksanders Zemdegs (/ˈfɛlɪks ˈzɛmdɛɡz/, Latvian: Fēlikss Zemdegs; born 20 December 1995) is an Australian Rubik's Cube solver. A speedsolver, he is one of two people to have won the 3x3 cube event at the World Cube Association World Championship twice, the other being Max Park. Zemdegs won in 2013 and 2015, and is often considered the greatest speedcuber of all time. He has set more than 350 records across various speedcubing events: 121 world records, 228 continental records, and 7 national records.

== Biography ==
Feliks Zemdegs is of Latvian descent, and his maternal grandmother is Lithuanian. Zemdegs bought his first speedcube in April 2008 after being inspired by speedcubing videos and tutorials on YouTube. The first unofficial time he recorded was an average of 19.73 seconds on 14 June 2008.

Zemdegs has a website, CubeSkills, which includes tutorials on solving the Rubik's Cube and other puzzles. There are free algorithm sheets and speedsolving tutorial videos. The site also offers a premium membership which enables access to advanced speedsolving videos.

Zemdegs attended St Kevin's College, Toorak, and graduated in 2013 with a perfect study score in VCE English and an ATAR of 99.90. Zemdegs has a Bachelor of Commerce from the University of Melbourne, majoring in economics, with a breadth study track in mechanical engineering. Zemdegs currently works in investment finance. In March 2026, Zemdegs married Jia Ying Kho.

As of September 2026, Zemdegs' YouTube channel has more than 476,000 subscribers.

In 2020, Zemdegs was one of the primary subjects of the Netflix documentary The Speed Cubers.

In 2024, he voiced the character Vegemite on Toast on the animated web series Battle for Dream Island.

== Career ==
Zemdegs won the 3×3×3 event at the first competition he attended, the New Zealand Championships 2009 on 18 July 2009, with an average of 13.74 seconds in the final round. He also won 2×2×2, 4×4×4, 5×5×5, 3×3×3 blindfolded, and 3×3×3 one-handed, and set 11 Oceanic records at this competition.

At his next competition, the Melbourne Summer Open 2010 on 30 January 2010, Zemdegs set his first world records for 3×3×3 average and 4×4×4 average, with times of 9.21 seconds and 42.01 seconds, respectively. He held the 3×3×3 average world record continuously from then until 23 April 2017, improving it 8 times, eventually to 6.45 seconds. The most world records he has held at one time is 12 in May 2011.

At the World Championship 2011 in Bangkok, Zemdegs won 2×2×2, 4×4×4, 5×5×5, and 6×6×6. He also took third in 3×3×3 after winning the first three rounds and placed third in 7×7×7.

At the World Championship 2013 in Las Vegas, Zemdegs won 3×3×3, 4×4×4, and 3×3×3 one-handed. He also placed second in 5×5×5 and third in 7×7×7.

At the World Championship 2015 in São Paulo, Zemdegs won 3×3×3, 2×2×2, 4×4×4, and 5×5×5. He also placed second in 6×6×6, 7×7×7, and Megaminx.

At the World Championship 2017 in Paris, Zemdegs won 5×5×5 and 7×7×7. He also took second in 6×6×6, 3×3×3 One-handed, and Megaminx, and placed third in 4×4×4. For the 3x3x3 event, despite being world champion in 2013 and 2015, he came fourth place.

At the World Championship 2019 in Melbourne, Zemdegs only placed in the top three in one event, getting third in 5x5x5.

On 5 June 2021, Zemdegs lost his last world record (his 5.53 3x3x3 average) to Chinese speedcuber Ruihang Xu.

At the World Championship 2023 in Incheon, Zemdegs failed to place top 3 in any event and did not make the semi-finals in the 3x3x3 event, his first time failing to do so since beginning in 2011.

At the World Championship 2025 in Seattle, Zemdegs advanced to the semi-finals in the main 3x3x3 event but did not qualify for the finals.

As of October 2026, Zemdegs is currently ranked 54th in the world for 3x3x3 average with a result of 5.53, set in 2019 and 52nd in the world for 3x3x3 single, with a result of 4.12, set in 2026.

Zemdegs still holds the record for the most number of 5x5x5 world records by a single competitor at 37.

== World records ==
World records by Zemdegs.

Event	Type	First world record	Latest world record	Total
3×3×3	Single	7.03s Melbourne Cube Day 2010; 13 November	4.22s Cube For Cambodia 2018; 6 May	10
3×3×3	Average	9.21s Melbourne Summer Open 2010; 30 January	5.53s Odd Day in Sydney 2019; 10 November	13
2×2×2	Average	2.35s Asian Championship 2010; 9–10 October	2.12s Melbourne Cube Day 2010; 13 November	2
4×4×4	Single	35.55s New Zealand Champs 2010; 10 July	19.36s LatAm Tour – Arequipa 2017; 22 June	12
4×4×4	Average	42.01s Melbourne Summer Open 2010; 30 January	25.97s Adelaide Summer 2017; 21 January	7
5×5×5	Single	1:02.93; Australian Nationals 2010; 4–5 September	37.93s Canberra Autumn 2018; 21–22 April	16
5×5×5	Average	1:07.59; Australian Nationals 2010; 4–5 September	43.21s Melbourne Cube Days 2017; 18–19 November	21
6×6×6	Single	2:05.88; Melbourne Summer 2011; 29–30 January	1:20.03; World Championship 2017; 13–16 July	6
6×6×6	Average	2:15.64; Melbourne Summer 2011; 29–30 January	1:27.79; World Championship 2017; 13–16 July	8
7×7×7	Single	2:23.55; World Championship 2015; 17–19 July	2:06.73; World Championship 2017; 13–16 July	5
7×7×7	Average	2:52.09; Australian Nationals 2013; 7–8 September	2:14.04; China's 10th Anniversary 2017; 1–2 October	11
3×3×3 One-handed	Single	11.16s Kubaroo Open 2011; 7 May	6.88s Canberra Autumn 2015; 9–10 May	4
3×3×3 One-handed	Average	14.76s Australian Nationals 2010; 4–5 September	10.21s Malaysia Cube Open 2017; 14–15 October	5
4×4×4 Blindfolded	Single	3:37.80; Melbourne Summer 2011; 29–30 January	3:37.80; Melbourne Summer 2011; 29–30 January	1

== Official personal records ==
Listed below are Zemdegs' personal records achieved in official World Cube Association competitions as of May 2026.

Event	Type	Time	Competition
3x3x3	Single	4.12	Spark Melbourne Autumn 2026
3x3x3	Average	5.53	Odd Day in Sydney 2019
2x2x2	Single	0.71	Rijswijk Open 2018
2x2x2	Average	1.45	Melbourne Cube Days 2023
4x4x4	Single	17.98	Altona Algorithms Attempt 2 2021
4x4x4	Average	21.57	Altona Algorithms Attempt 2 2021
5x5x5	Single	36.18	Tassie Summer 2026
5x5x5	Average	40.10	VIC State Championship 2025
6x6x6	Single	1:09.26	VIC Side State Championship 2025
6x6x6	Average	1:13.96	Melbourne Cube Days 2025
7x7x7	Single	1:45.99	Braybrook Big Cubes 2026
7x7x7	Average	1:53.48	Braybrook Big Cubes 2026
3x3x3 Blindfolded	Single	34.37	Odd Day in Sydney 2019
3x3x3 Blindfolded	Average	47.13	Ugine Jeu et Jouet 2018
3x3x3 Fewest Moves	Single	24	Koalafication Sydney 2019
3x3x3 Fewest Moves	Average	27.33	Canberra Autumn 2015
3x3x3 One-handed	Single	6.88	Canberra Autumn 2015
3x3x3 One-handed	Average	9.60	Melbourne Cube Days 2023
Clock	Single	8.81	Australian Nationals 2011
Clock	Average	11.80	Australian Nationals 2011
Megaminx	Single	33.11	CubingUSA Nationals 2018
Megaminx	Average	36.65	Weston-super-Mare Open 2018
Pyraminx	Single	2.27	Perth Autumn 2018
Pyraminx	Average	4.20	Melbourne Summer 2022
Skewb	Single	2.20	Melbourne Summer 2021
Skewb	Average	5.08	Sydney Re-Open Saturday 2021
Square-1	Single	8.99	Adelaide Summer 2018
Square-1	Average	12.58	CubingUSA Nationals 2018
4x4x4 Blindfolded	Single	3:37.80	Melbourne Summer Open 2011
5x5x5 Blindfolded	Single	11:56.00	Adelaide Summer 2018
3x3x3 Multi-Blind	Single	11/11 47:01	Adelaide Summer 2018
