= Panagiotis Verdes =

Greek inventor

Panagiotis Verdes is a Greek inventor and is known for being the first person to mass-produce 6x6x6 puzzles and 7x7x7 twisty puzzles. He is also known for founding the company V-Cube. He has also worked on new designs of every Twisty Puzzle from 2x2x2 to 11x11x11.

== Life ==
Verdes was born in Chiliomodi, Korinthos, a province in southern Greece, where he graduated from high school. He followed his passion for constructions and studied at the Aristotelian University of Thessaloniki from 1965 until 1970. During his career, he was primarily involved in building, road and public network constructions until his retirement in 2003.

== V-Cube ==
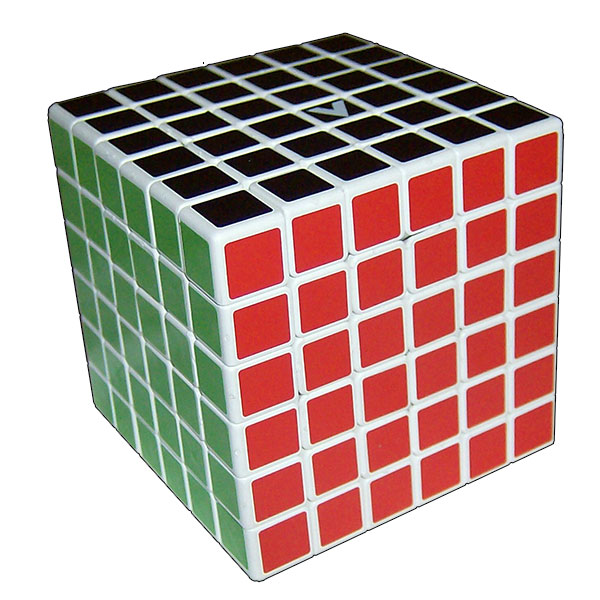
The V-Cube 6 in solved state

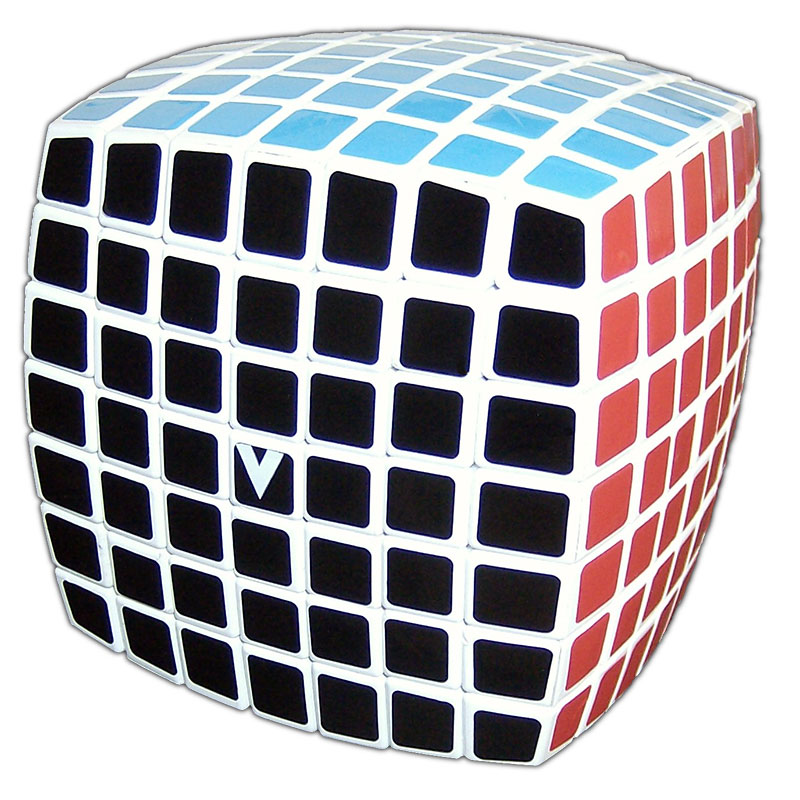
The V-Cube 7 in solved state

V-Cube is a brand name owned by Verdes Innovations, a company owned by Panagiotis. The V-Cube brand is used to sell puzzles that are similar to the original Rubik's Cube. The brand is known for being the first to mass-produce the first ever 6x6x6 and 7x7x7 puzzles, and for being the first to create a design that would allow for puzzles up to the 11x11x11. Prior to Verdes' invention, the 6x6x6 cube was thought to be impossible due to geometry constraints. Verdes's invention uses a completely different mechanism than the smaller Rubik's cubes; his mechanism is based on concentric, right-angle conical surfaces whose axes of rotation coincide with the semi-axes of the cube. The patents for the cubes were awarded in 2004, and mass-production began in 2008.
