= Tymon Kolasiński =

Polish speedcuber (born 2005)

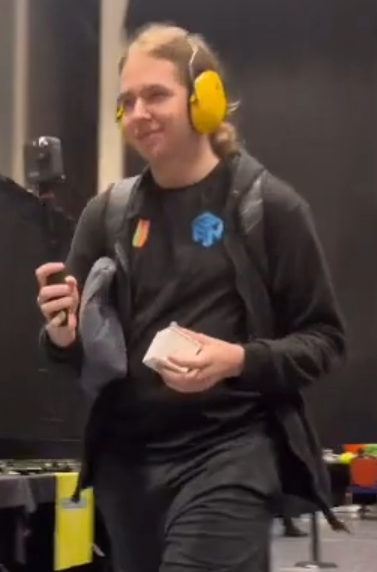
- Kolasiński in 2022
- Born: 21 June 2005 (age 21)
- Years active: 2016–present
- Known for: Rubik's Cube speedsolving
Medal record
Representing Poland
Speedcubing
WCA World Championship
Event	1st	2nd	3rd
3x3x3	0	0	2
4x4x4	1	0	1
5x5x5	1	1	0
6x6x6	1	1	0
7x7x7	0	2	0
Pyraminx	1	0	0
Total	4	4	3
Gold medal – first place	2019 Melbourne	Pyraminx
Gold medal – first place	2023 Incheon	4x4x4
Gold medal – first place	2023 Incheon	6x6x6
Gold medal – first place	2025 Seattle	5x5x5
Silver medal – second place	2023 Incheon	5x5x5
Silver medal – second place	2023 Incheon	7x7x7
Silver medal – second place	2025 Seattle	6x6x6
Silver medal – second place	2025 Seattle	7x7x7
Bronze medal – third place	2023 Incheon	3x3x3
Bronze medal – third place	2025 Seattle	3x3x3
Bronze medal – third place	2025 Seattle	4x4x4
WCA European Championship
Event	1st	2nd	3rd
3x3x3	1	1	1
4x4x4	2	0	1
5x5x5	3	0	0
6x6x6	3	0	0
7x7x7	2	1	0
Pyraminx	1	0	0
Total	12	2	2
Gold medal – first place	2022 Copenhagen	5x5x5
Gold medal – first place	2022 Copenhagen	6x6x6
Gold medal – first place	2022 Copenhagen	7x7x7
Gold medal – first place	2022 Copenhagen	Pyraminx
Gold medal – first place	2024 Pamplona	3x3x3
Gold medal – first place	2024 Pamplona	4x4x4
Gold medal – first place	2024 Pamplona	5x5x5
Gold medal – first place	2024 Pamplona	6x6x6
Gold medal – first place	2026 Arnhem	4x4x4
Gold medal – first place	2026 Arnhem	5x5x5
Gold medal – first place	2026 Arnhem	6x6x6
Gold medal – first place	2026 Arnhem	7x7x7
Silver medal – second place	2022 Copenhagen	3x3x3
Silver medal – second place	2024 Pamplona	7x7x7
Bronze medal – third place	2022 Copenhagen	4x4x4
Bronze medal – third place	2026 Arnhem	3x3x3

Tymon Kolasiński (born 21 June 2005) is a Polish speedcuber. He currently holds the tenth-best average of five 3×3×3 solves (by WCA standards) at 4.49 seconds. He has also set world records in the 3×3×3, 4×4×4, 5×5×5, and Pyraminx events, in addition to European records in the 6×6×6 and 7×7×7 events. He currently holds the world record single and average of 5 in the 5×5×5 event, with times of 29.49 seconds and 33.73 seconds, respectively. He also holds the world record single in the 4×4×4 event with a time of 15.18 seconds, broken at the Spanish Championship 2025.

At the 2023 World Championship, Kolasiński was crowned world champion in the 4×4×4 and 6×6×6 events, and finished as the runner-up in the 5×5×5 and the 7×7×7 events. He also secured a third place finish in the 3×3×3 event. He also won the 3×3×3, 4×4×4, 5×5×5, and 6×6×6 events at the 2024 European Championship. He was formerly the Pyraminx world champion, winning in 2019.

Kolasiński is best known for his efficient ZB solutions, using advanced techniques paired with quick thinking in order to stay consistent. He popularized the 3×3×3 "pseudoslotting" technique, a combination of multislotting and keyhole.

As of 14 November 2026, Kolasiński has won 532 events in World Cube Association competitions. He has broken 16 world records, 66 European continental records, and 52 Polish national records.

As of 14 November 2026, Kolasiński's YouTube channel has over 101,000 subscribers.

== Career ==
Before rising to the spotlight for his success in N×N×N cubes, Kolasiński specialized in the Pyraminx event. He previously achieved the Pyraminx world record single and average on five occasions. He became the Pyraminx world champion at the 2019 WCA World Championship, finishing with an average of 2.40 seconds.

On 19 December 2021, at Cubers Eve Lubartów 2021, Kolasiński achieved an average of 5.09 seconds, breaking Max Park’s 3×3×3 world record average of 5.32 seconds. Kolasiński later broke this record at Cube4fun in Warsaw 2022, with an average of 4.86 seconds. This record was later tied by Park, before being beaten in 2023 by Yiheng Wang.

At the Rubik's WCA European Championship 2022, Kolasiński achieved his first official 3×3×3 competition solve under 4 seconds.

At the WCA World Championship in 2023, Kolasiński got third place behind Yiheng Wang and Max Park.

On 29 September 2024, at DuPage Fall 2024, Kolasiński achieved a 5×5×5 single of 31.60 seconds, beating Max Park's world record. This was the first time in nearly 6 years that somebody besides Max Park had this record.

On 5 July 2025, at the Rubik's WCA World Championship 2025, Kolasiński achieved a 5×5×5 average of five of 34.31 seconds, beating Max Park's world record. This was the first time in almost 7 years that somebody besides Max Park had this record. This also made him the world champion for the event. In 3×3×3, Kolasiński once again got third place, this time behind Xuanyi Geng and Yiheng Wang, with a 4.98 average of five.

On 1 May 2026, at All Rounders Katowice I 2026, in first round, Tymon broke both 5x5x5 world records again, with 29.49 second single and 33.73 average, becoming the first person to ever solve a 5x5x5 cube in under thirty seconds at a WCA sanctioned competition.

== Notable rankings ==
Kolasiński's rankings as of 13 November 2026:

Event	Format	Time (sec)	World Rank	Continental Rank
3×3×3	Single	3.56	21	2
3×3×3	Ao5	4.49	11	2
2×2×2	Single	0.60	89	31
2×2×2	Ao5	1.08	19	9
4×4×4	Single	15.18	1	1
4×4×4	Ao5	18.56	1	1
5×5×5	Single	29.49	1	1
5×5×5	Ao5	33.73	1	2
6×6×6	Single	59.84	3	2
6×6×6	Mo3	1:05.78	4	2
7×7×7	Single	1:32.69	3	2
7×7×7	Mo3	1:41.43	8	2
Pyraminx	Single	0.98	42	16
Pyraminx	Ao5	1.72	59	16
