= The Speed Cubers =

2020 American documentary by Sue Kim

- Official release poster
- Directed by: Sue Kim
- Produced by: Sue Kim; Christopher Olson
- Starring: Max Park; Feliks Zemdegs
- Edited by: Katie Turinski; Dylan Sylwester
- Music by: Dan Vidmar
- Production companies: Saltwater Films; Romano Films; Wieden & Kennedy
- Distributed by: Netflix
- Release date: July 29, 2020
- Running time: 40 minutes
- Country: United States

The Speed Cubers is a 2020 documentary on the lives of speedcubing champions Max Park and Feliks Zemdegs directed by Sue Kim.

== Focus ==
The documentary's main focus is the rivalry and friendship between two of the fastest speedcubers in the world, Max Park and Feliks Zemdegs. Announced in June 2020, the film was directed by Sue Kim and premiered on July 29, 2020, on Netflix.

=== Venue featured ===
Some of the footage was shot at the World Cube Association's World Championships 2019 held in Melbourne, Australia.

== Premise ==
The documentary captures the "extraordinary twists and turns in the journeys of Rubik's Cube-solving champions Max Park and Feliks Zemdegs."

== Reception ==
On the review aggregator website Rotten Tomatoes, 100% of 13 critics' reviews are positive, with an average rating of 8.2/10. On February 9, 2021, the documentary was shortlisted in the Documentary Short Subject category of the 93rd Academy Awards. At the 5th Critics' Choice Documentary Awards, The Speed Cubers was nominated for Best Short Documentary. The film also received a nomination for the Peabody Award under the documentaries category.

== See also ==
- Cubers, another documentary about speedcubing
