= Professor's Cube =

5x5x5 version of the Rubik's Cube

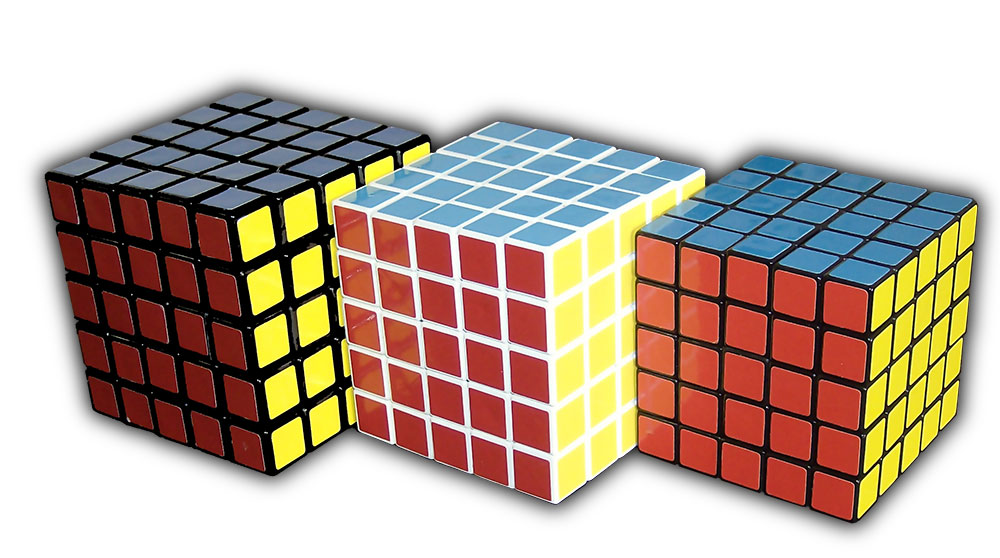
Rubik's brand Professor's Cube (left), V-Cube 5 (center), and Eastsheen 5×5 (right)

The Professor's Cube (also known as the 5×5×5 Rubik's Cube and many other names, depending on manufacturer) is a 5×5×5 version of the original Rubik's Cube. It has qualities in common with both the 3×3×3 Rubik's Cube and the 4×4×4 Rubik's Revenge, and solution strategies for both can be applied.

== History ==
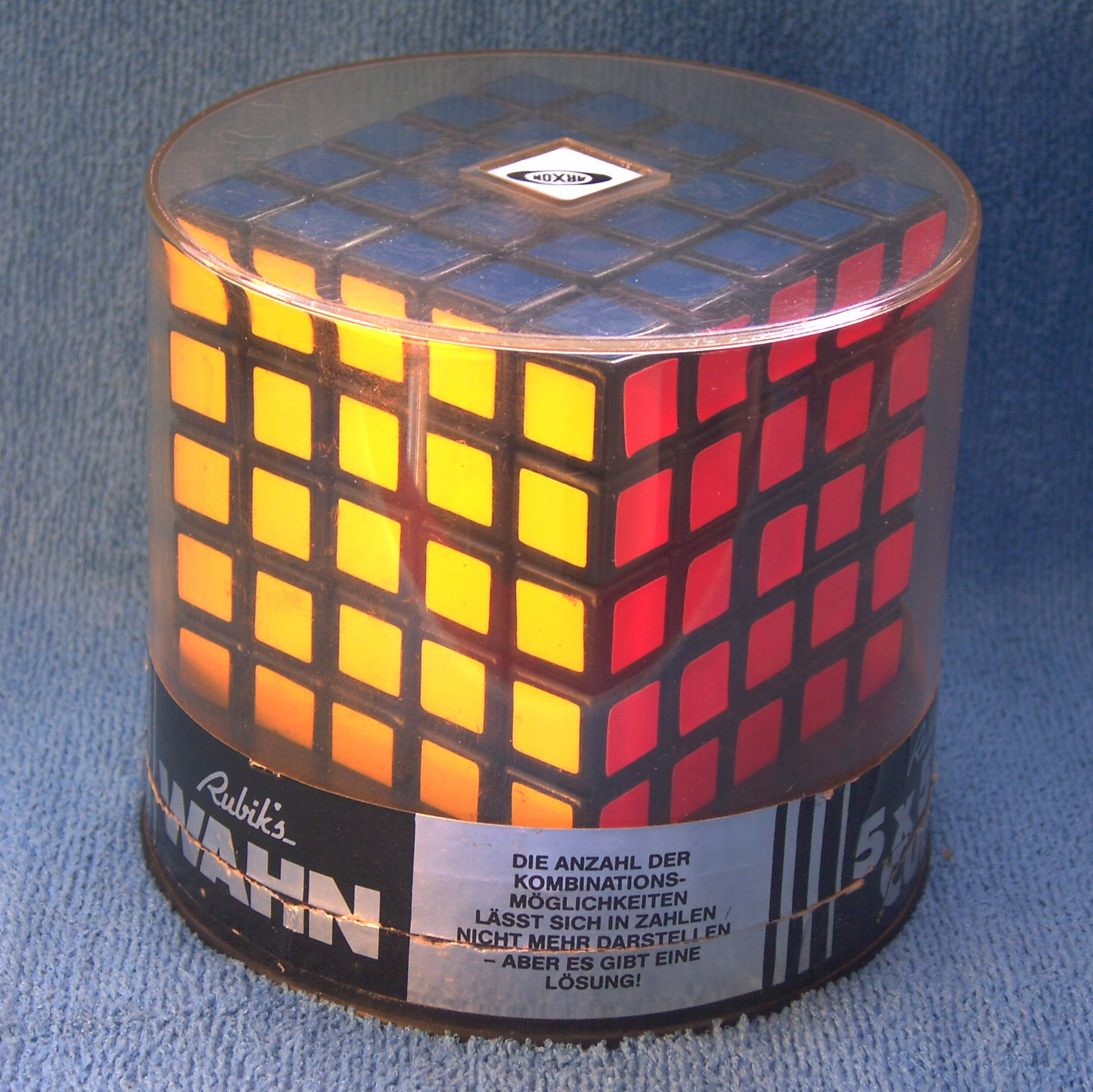
Professor's Cube in original packaging

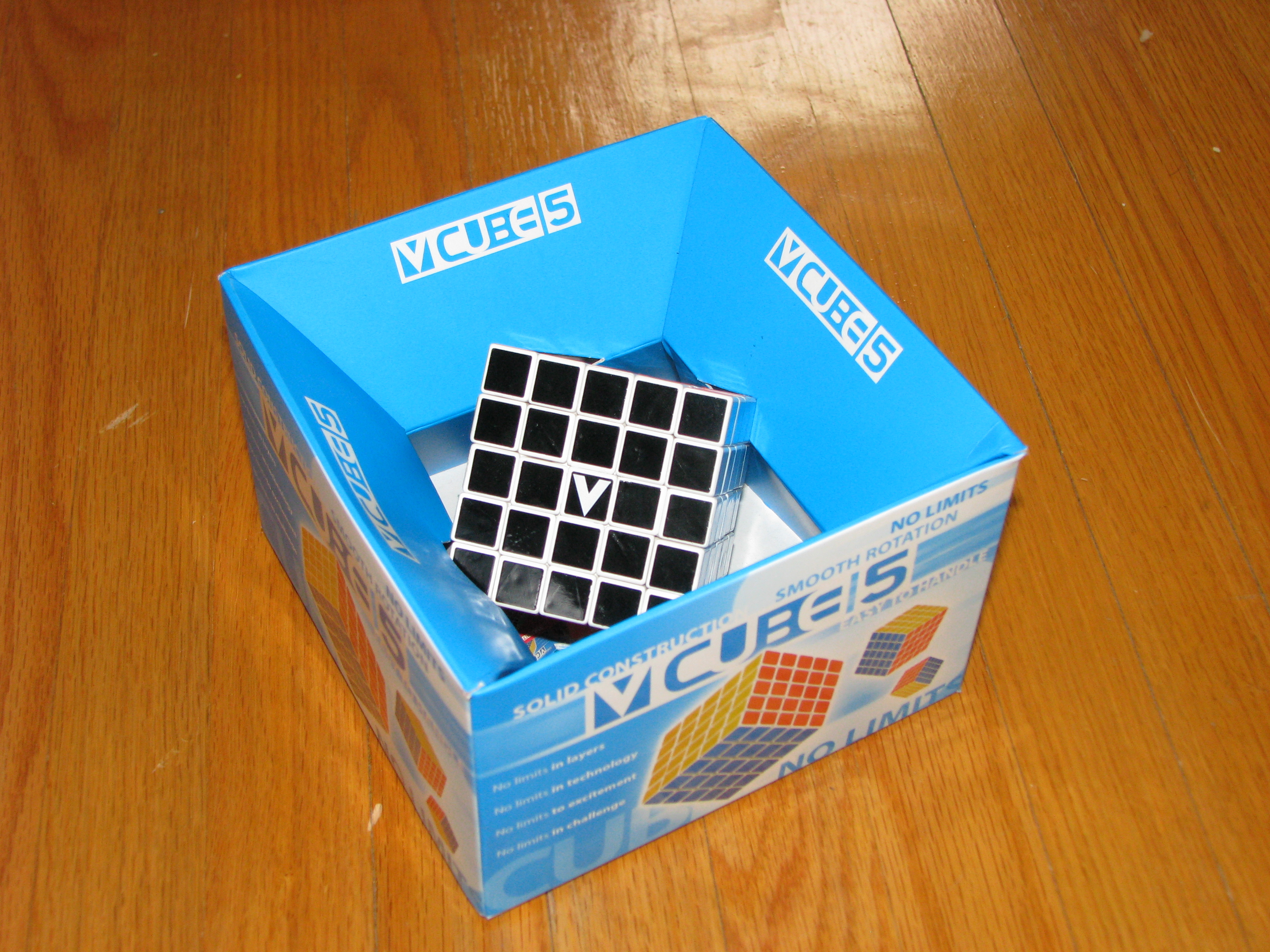
The V-Cube 5 in its original packaging

The Professor's Cube was invented by Udo Krell in 1981. Out of the many designs that were proposed, Udo Krell's design was the first 5×5×5 design that was manufactured and sold. Uwe Mèffert manufactured the cube and sold it in Hong Kong in 1983.

Ideal Toys, who first popularized the original 3x3x3 Rubik's cube, marketed the puzzle in Germany as the "Rubik's Wahn" (German: Rubik's Craze). When the cube was marketed in Japan, it was marketed under the name "Professor's Cube". Mèffert reissued the cube under the name "Professor's Cube" in the 1990s.

The early versions of the 5×5×5 cube sold at Barnes & Noble were marketed under the name "Professor's Cube", but currently, Barnes and Noble sells cubes that are simply called "5×5 Cube." Mefferts.com used to sell a limited-edition version of the 5×5×5 cube called the Professor's Cube. This version had colored tiles rather than stickers. Verdes Innovations sells a version called the V-Cube 5.

== Workings ==
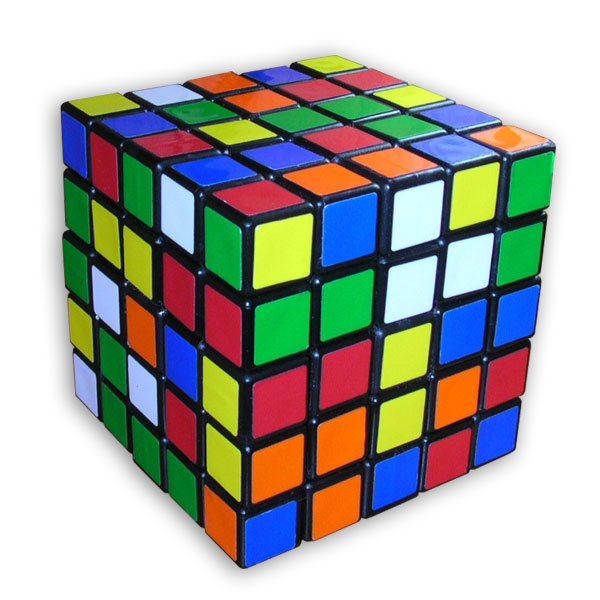
Professor's Cube in scrambled state

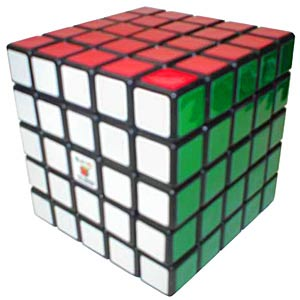
Professor's Cube in solved state

The original Professor's Cube design by Udo Krell works by using an expanded 3×3×3 cube as a mantle with the center edge pieces and corners sticking out from the spherical center of identical mechanism to the 3×3×3 cube. All non-central pieces have extensions that fit into slots on the outer pieces of the 3×3×3, which keeps them from falling out of the cube while making a turn. The fixed centers have two sections (one visible, one hidden) which can turn independently. This feature is unique to the original design.

The Eastsheen version of the puzzle uses a different mechanism. The fixed centers hold the centers next to the central edges in place, which in turn hold the outer edges. The non-central edges hold the corners in place, and the internal sections of the corner pieces do not reach the center of the cube.

The V-Cube 5 mechanism, designed by Panagiotis Verdes, has elements in common with both. The corners reach to the center of the puzzle (like the original mechanism) and the center pieces hold the central edges in place (like the Eastsheen mechanism). The middle edges and center pieces adjacent to them make up the supporting frame and these have extensions which hold the rest of the pieces together. This allows smooth and fast rotation and created what was arguably the fastest and most durable version of the puzzle available at that time. Unlike the original 5×5×5 design, the V-Cube 5 mechanism was designed to allow speedcubing. Most current production 5×5×5 speed cubes have mechanisms based on Verdes' patent.

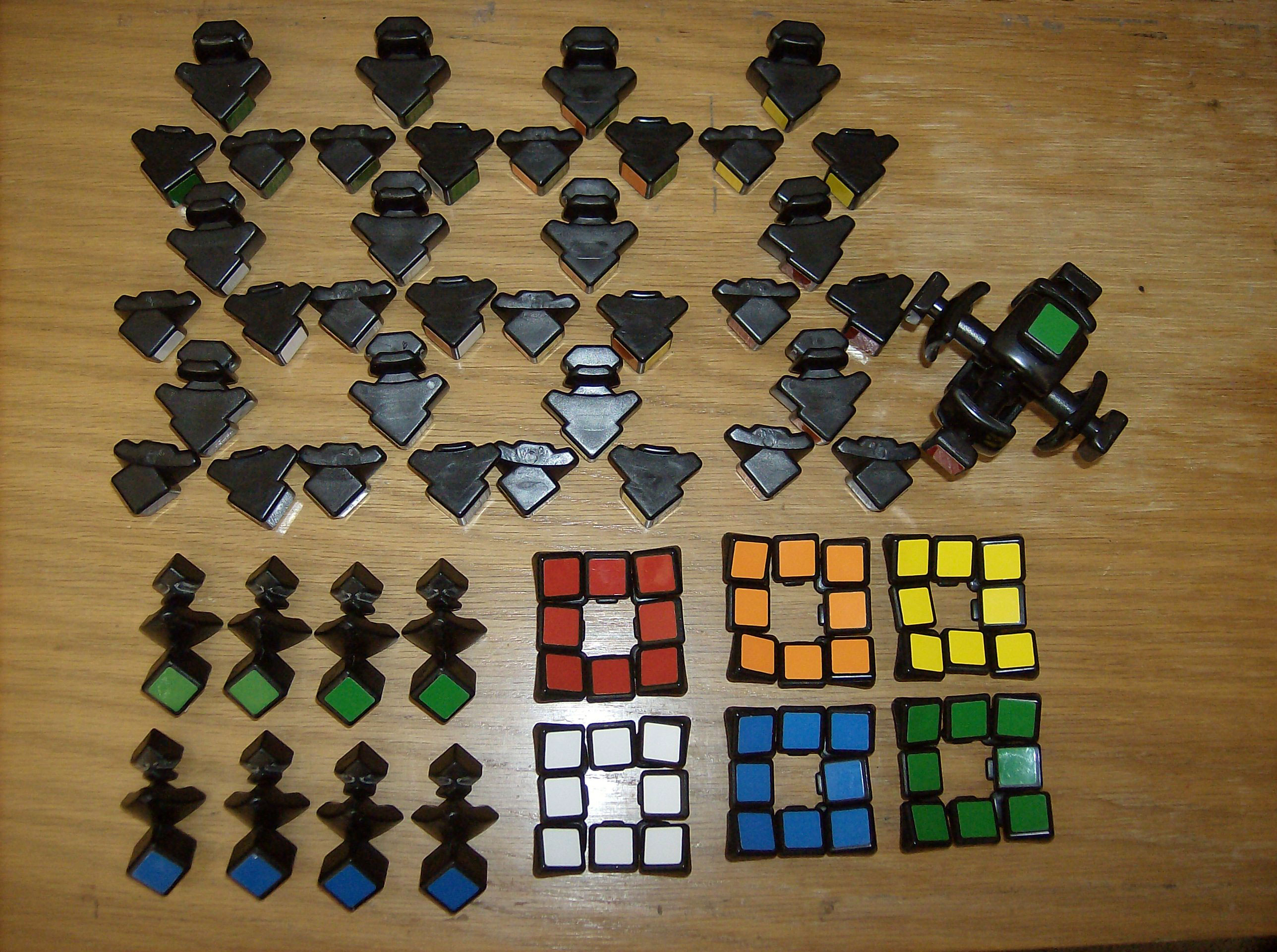
A disassembled Professor's Cube

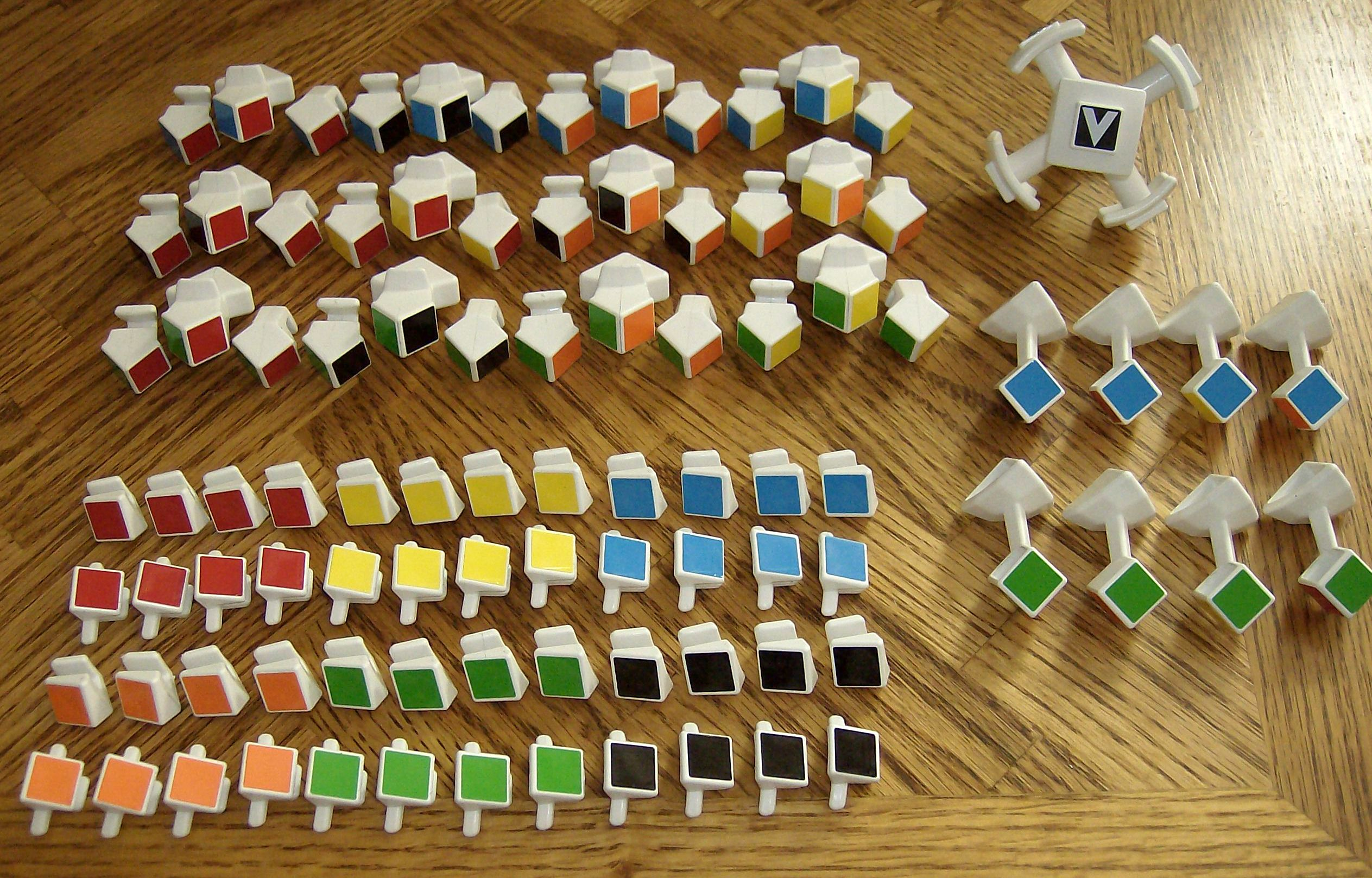
A disassembled V-Cube 5

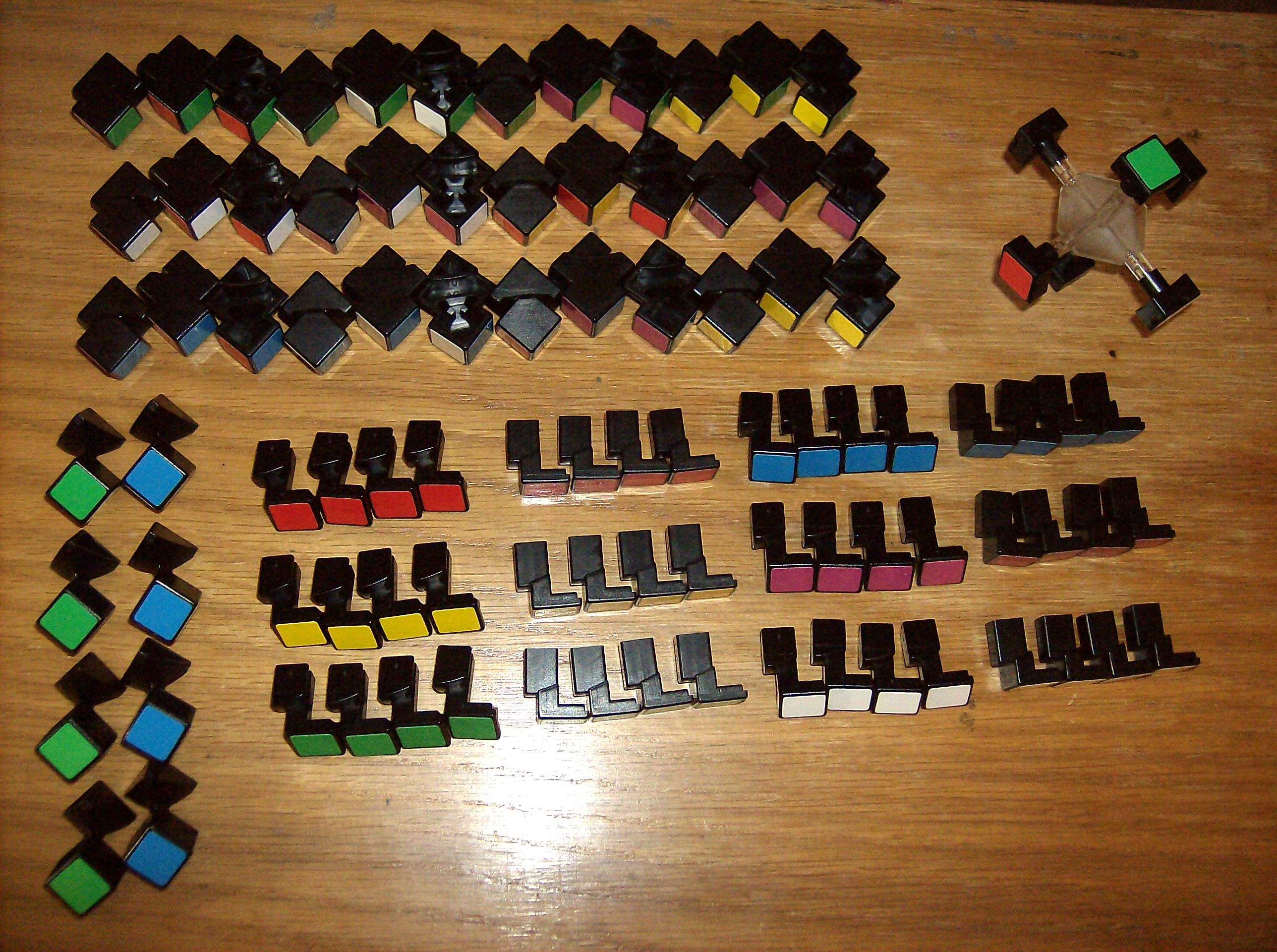
A disassembled Eastsheen cube

== Stability and durability ==
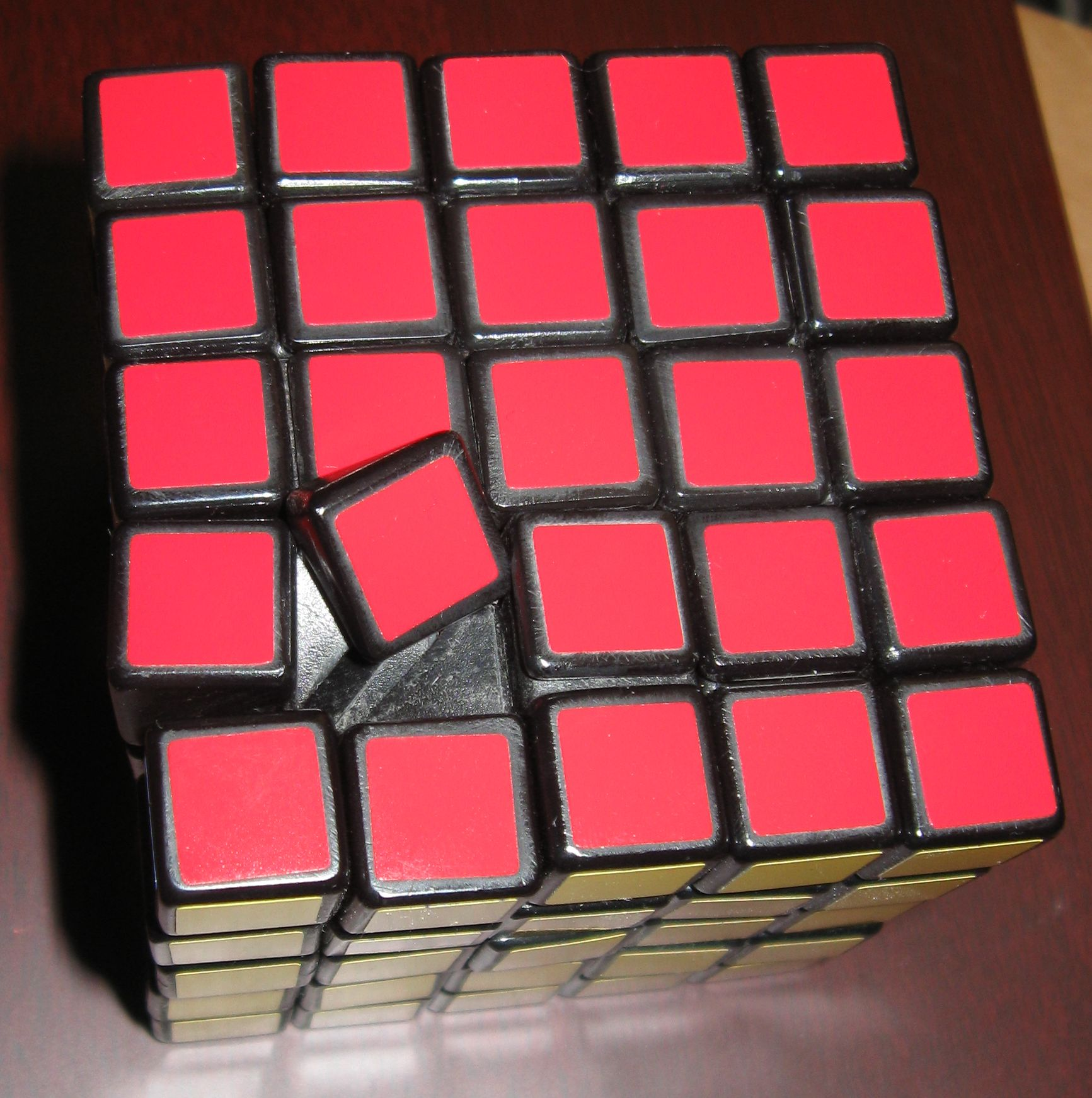
This type of center misalignment occurred during a turn and can only occur with the original design.

The original Professor's Cube is inherently more delicate than the 3×3×3 Rubik's Cube because of the much greater number of moving parts and pieces. Because of its fragile design, the Rubik's brand Professor's Cube is not suitable for speedcubing. Applying excessive force to the cube when twisting it may result in broken pieces. Both the Eastsheen 5×5×5 and the V-Cube 5 are designed with different mechanisms in an attempt to remedy the fragility of the original design.

== Permutations ==
There are 98 pieces on the outside of the cube: 8 corners, 12 center edges, 24 winged edges (36 combined edges), 6 fixed middle centers, 24 edge centers, and 24 corner centers (54 combined centers).

Any permutation of the corners is possible, including odd permutations, giving 8! possible arrangements. Seven of the corners can be independently rotated, and the orientation of the eighth corner depends on the other seven, giving 3^{7} (or 2,187) combinations.

There are 54 centers. Six of these (the center square of each face) are fixed in position. The rest consist of two sets of 24 centers. Within each set there are four centers of each color. Each set can be arranged in 24! different ways. Assuming that the four centers of each color in each set are indistinguishable, the number of permutations of each set is reduced to 24!/(24^{6}) arrangements, all of which are possible. The reducing factor comes about because there are 4! (or 24) ways to arrange the four pieces of a given color. This is raised to the sixth power because there are six colors. The total number of permutations of all movable centers is the product of the permutations of the two sets, 24!^{2}/(24^{12}).

The 24 outer edges cannot be flipped due to the interior shape of those pieces. Corresponding outer edges are distinguishable, since the pieces are mirror images of each other. Any permutation of the outer edges is possible, including odd permutations, giving 24! arrangements. The 12 central edges can be flipped. Eleven can be flipped and arranged independently, giving 12!/2 × 2^{11} or 12! × 2^{10} possibilities (an odd permutation of the corners implies an odd permutation of the central edges, and vice versa, thus the division by 2). There are 24! × 12! × 2^{10} possibilities for the inner and outer edges together.

This gives a total number of permutations of

$$\frac{8! \times 3^7 \times 12! \times 2^{10} \times 24!^3}{24^{12}} \approx 2.83 \times 10^{74}$$

The full number is precisely 282 870 942 277 741 856 536 180 333 107 150 328 293 127 731 985 672 134 721 536 000 000 000 000 000. (about 283 duodecillion on the long scale or 283 trevigintillion on the short scale).

Some variations of the cube have one of the center pieces marked with a logo, which can be put into four different orientations. This increases the number of permutations by a factor of four to 1.13×10^{75}, although any orientation of this piece could be regarded as correct. By comparison, the number of atoms in the observable universe is estimated at 10^{80}. Other variations increase the difficulty by making the orientation of all center pieces visible. An example of this is shown below.

== Solutions ==
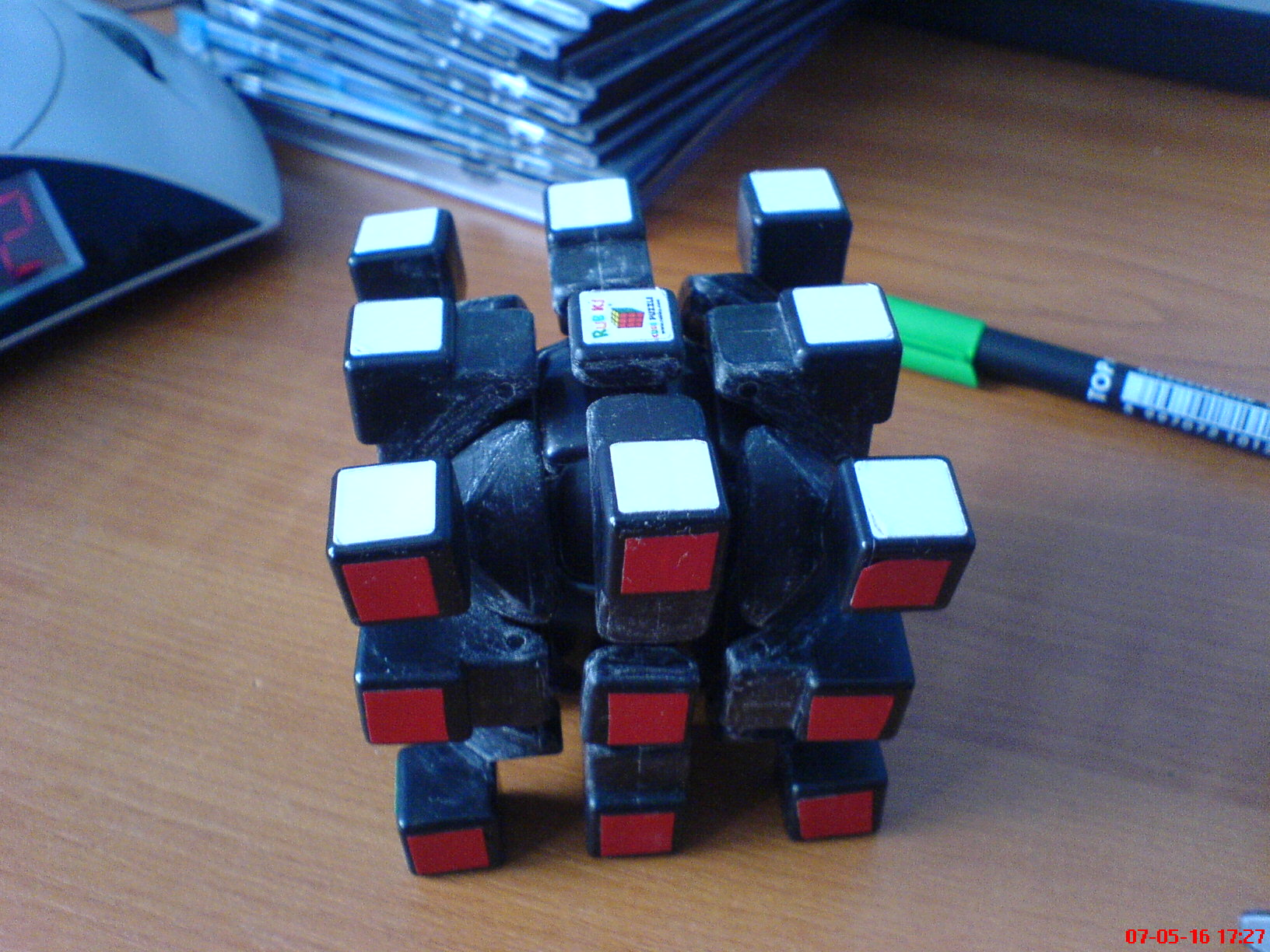
An original Professor's Cube with many of the pieces removed, showing the 3×3×3 equivalence of the remaining pieces

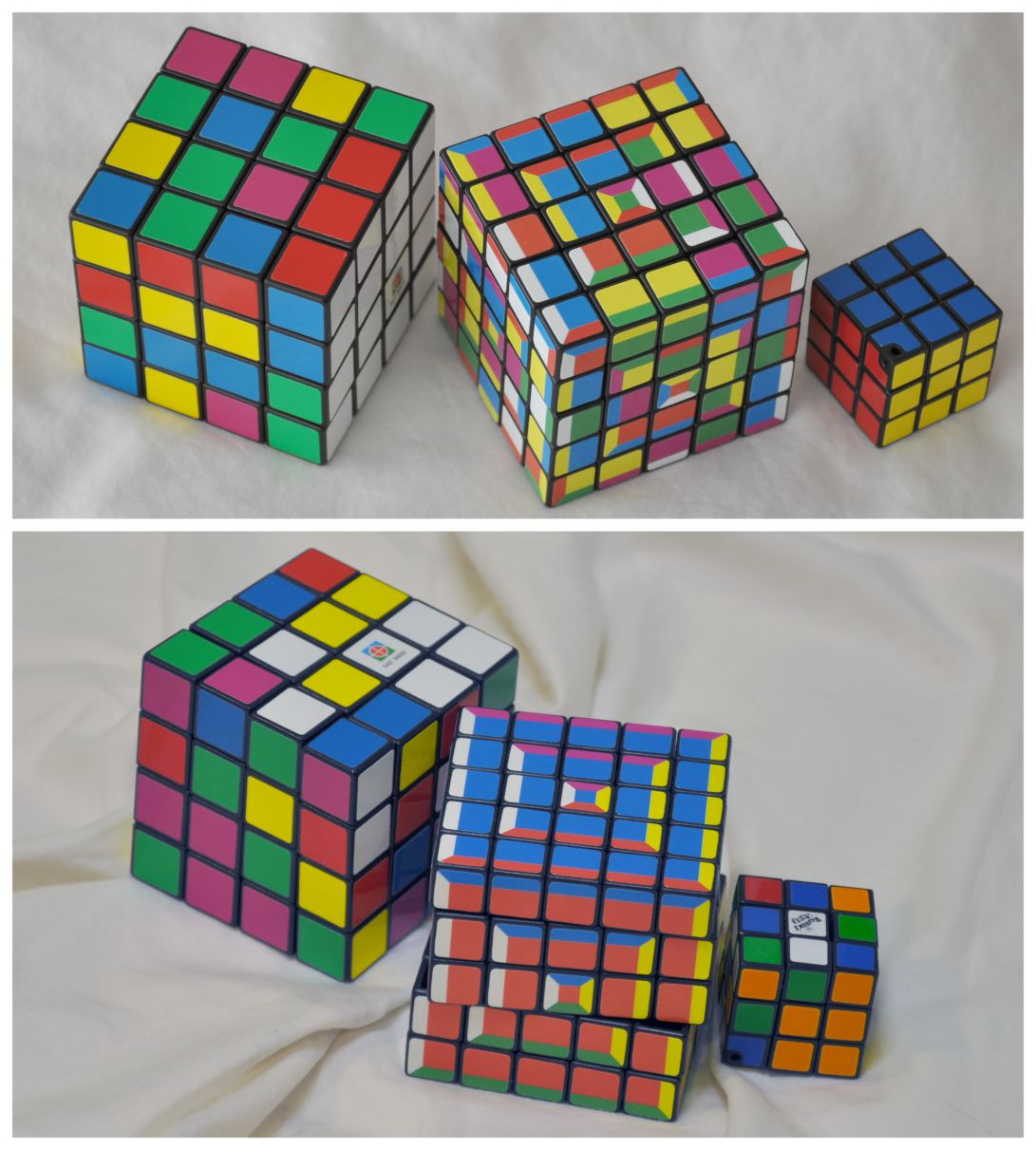
Top and bottom pictures: Left is an Eastsheen 4×4. Center is an EastSheen 5×5×5 cube with multicolored stickers, which increase difficulty because the centers need to be in correct places. Right is a 3×3 Rubik's Cube.

Speedcubers usually favor the Reduction method, which groups the centers into one-colored blocks and grouping similar edge pieces into solid strips. This turns the puzzle into an oddly-proportioned 3×3×3 cube and allows the cube to be quickly solved with the same methods one would use for that puzzle. As illustrated to the right, the fixed centers, middle edges and corners can be treated as equivalent to a 3×3×3 cube. As a result, once reduction is complete the parity errors sometimes seen on the 4×4×4 cannot occur on the 5×5×5, or any cube with an odd number of layers.

The Yau5 method is named after its proposer, Robert Yau. The method starts by solving the opposite centers (preferably white and yellow), then solving three cross edges (preferably white). Next, the remaining centers and last cross edge are solved. The last cross edge and the remaining unsolved edges are solved, and then it can be solved like a 3×3×3.

A less used strategy is to solve the edges and corners of the cube first, and the centers last. This method is referred to as the Cage method, so called because the centers appear to be in a cage after the solving of edges and corners. The corners can be placed just as they are in any previous order of cube puzzle, and the centers are manipulated with an algorithm similar to the one used in the 4×4×4 cube.

Another less frequently used strategy is to solve one side and one layer first, then the 2nd, 3rd and 4th layer, and finally the last side and layer. This method is referred to as Layer-by-Layer. This resembles CFOP, a well known technique used for the 3×3 Rubik's Cube, but with 2 added layers and a couple of centers.

ABCube Method is a direct solve method originated by Sunshine Workman in 2020. It is geared to complete beginners and non-cubers. It is similar in order of operation to the Cage Method, but differs functionally in that it is mostly visual and eliminates the standardized notation typically needed to solve cubes of this size. It works on all complexity of cubes, from 2×2×2 through big cubes (n×n×n) and only utilizes two easy to remember algorithms; one four twists, the other eight twists. This method also eliminates long parity algorithms.

== World records ==
The world record for fastest 5×5×5 solve is 29.49 seconds, set by Tymon Kolasiński of Poland on May 1st, 2026, at All Rounders Katowice I 2026, in Katowice, Poland.

The world record for fastest average of five solves (excluding fastest and slowest solves) is 33.19 seconds, set by Timofei Tarasenko of Russia on October 4-5th, 2026, at Guangzhou Grand Open 2026, in Guangzhou, China, with the times of 35.42, 31.87, (37.15), (30.90), and 32.28 seconds.

The world record fastest time for solving a 5×5×5 cube blindfolded is 1 minute, 58.59 seconds (including inspection), set by Stanley Chapel of the United States on January 2nd, 2026, at Multi Mayhem VA 2026 in Charlottesville, Virginia.

The record for mean of three solves solving a 5x5x5 cube blindfolded is 2 minutes, 27.63 seconds (including inspection), set by Stanley Chapel of the United States on December 15th, 2019 at Michigan Cubing Club Epsilon 2019, in Ann Arbor, Michigan, with the times of 2:32.48, 2:28.80, and 2:21.62.

=== Top 10 solvers by single solve ===
| Rank | Name | Result | Competition |
|---|---|---|---|
| 1 | (Poland) Tymon Kolasiński | 29.49s | (Poland) All Rounders Katowice I 2026 |
| 2 | (Russia) Timofei Tarasenko | 30.45s | (China) Guangzhou Grand Open 2026 |
| 3 | (South Korea) Seung Hyuk Nahm (남승혁) | 30.60s | (Thailand) Suvarnabhumi Cube Open 2026 |
| 4 | (United States) Max Park | 30.63s | (Mexico) Speedcube Baja Open 2026 |
| 5 | (Chinese Taipei) Kai-Wen Wang (王楷文) | 31.61s | (Chinese Taipei) Taiwan Championship 2025 |
| 6 | (China) Ziyu Wu (吴子钰) | 31.62s | (China) Beijing Winter 2026 |
| 7 | (Vietnam) Đỗ Quang Hưng | 31.95s | Vietnam Championship 2026 |
| 8 | (United States) Henry Lichner | 31.98s | (United States) 4x4 Off US-40 IL 2026 |
| 9 | (Republic of Ireland) Ciarán Beahan | 33.20s | (United States) Rubik's WCA World Championship 2025 |
| 10 | (Malaysia) Lim Hung (林弘) | 33.82s | (Malaysia) MYHM UoSM Final Cube Open 2026 |

=== Top 10 solvers by average of 5 solves ===
| Rank | Name | Result | Competition | Times |
|---|---|---|---|---|
| 1 | (Russia) Timofei Tarasenko | 33.19s | (China) Guangzhou Grand Open 2026 | 35.42, 31.87, (37.15), (30.90), 32.28 |
| 2 | (Poland) Tymon Kolasiński | 33.73s | (Poland) All Rounders Katowice I 2026 | 33.43, (29.49), 33.21, 34.56, (35.52) |
| 3 | (United States) Max Park | 34.65s | (United States) Rubik's WCA North American Championship 2026 | (31.74), (37.61), 34.70, 37.03, 32.22 |
| 4 | (Vietnam) Đỗ Quang Hưng | 34.76s | Vietnam Championship 2026 | (31.95), 33.48, (41.16), 35.32, 35.49 |
| 5 | (South Korea) Seung Hyuk Nahm (남승혁) | 36.31s | (Thailand) Paradise Park Bangkok NxNxN 2026 | 36.04, 36.35, (33.99), 36.55, (40.76) |
| 6 | (Chinese Taipei) Kai-Wen Wang (王楷文) | 37.33s | (Malaysia) Rubik's WCA Asian Championship 2024 | 39.34, 36.32, (34.27), 36.33, (44.48) |
| 7 | (China) Ziyu Wu (吴子钰) | 37.41s | (China) Beijing Autumn Rivalry 2026 | (40.01), 36.64, 35.60, 40.00, (34.98) |
| 8 | (Malaysia) Lim Hung (林弘) | 38.12s | (Vietnam) MYHM HaNxNoi 2026 | 39.31, 36.29, (34.97), 38.76, (47.79) |
| 9 | (Singapore) Emmanuel Kao | 38.84s | Odd July Singapore 2026 | (37.26), (43.26), 38.22, 39.64, 38.66 |
| 10 | (United States) Matty Hiroto Inaba | 39.35s | (United States) Larchmont TGIF 2026 | 39.76, (42.10), (37.53), 38.53, 39.75 |

=== Top 10 solvers by single solve blindfolded ===
| Rank | Name | Result | Competition |
|---|---|---|---|
| 1 | (United States) Stanley Chapel | 1:58.59 | (United States) Multi Mayhem VA 2026 |
| 2 | (Malaysia) Hill Pong Yong Feng | 2:07.11 | (Malaysia) Selangor PBQ 2026 |
| 3 | (United Kingdom) Ryan Eckersley | 2:28.53 | (United Kingdom) Cambridge Autumn - British Blind Off 2024 |
| 4 | (China) Kaijun Lin (林恺俊) | 2:39.12 | (Malaysia) Selangor Cube Open 2019 |
| 5 | (Switzerland) Ezra Hirschi | 2:45.73 | (United Kingdom) Sheffield Spring - British Blind Off 2023 |
| 6 | (China) Zhe Wang (王哲) | 2:46.57 | (China) Please Be Quiet Shanghai 2025 |
| 7 | (Austria) Simon Praschl | 2:50.02 | (Czech Republic) Blind League Dobřejovice V: Uprise 2026 |
| 8 | (Canada) Elliott Kobelansky | 2:56.27 | (Canada) NCR Please Be Quiet 2023 |
| 9 | (Sweden) Daniel Wallin | 2:58.28 | (Sweden) Örebro Vinterkubing - Side 2025 |
| 10 | (United States) Graham Siggins | 2:58.31 | (United States) SacQuiet Spring 2025 |

=== Top 10 solvers by average of 3 solves blindfolded ===
| Rank | Name | Result | Competition | Times |
|---|---|---|---|---|
| 1 | (United States) Stanley Chapel | 2:27.63 | (United States) Michigan Cubing Club Epsilon 2019 | 2:32.48, 2:28.80, 2:21.62 |
| 2 | (Malaysia) Hill Pong Yong Feng | 2:30.84 | (Malaysia) Selangor PBQ 2026 | 2:44.59, 2:07.11, 2:40.81 |
| 3 | (China) Kaijun Lin (林恺俊) | 2:49.17 | (Malaysia) Selangor Cube Open 2019 | 2:59.09, 2:39.12, 2:49.30 |
| 4 | (United Kingdom) Ryan Eckersley | 2:54.01 | (Republic of Ireland) Mayo Cubing 2026 | 3:04.07, 2:52.53, 2:45.42 |
| 5 | (Austria) Simon Praschl | 3:08.81 | (Czech Republic) Czech Quiet Championship 2026 | 2:53.58, 3:22.04, 3:10.82 |
| 6 | (Switzerland) Ezra Hirschi | 3:11.65 | (Switzerland) Swiss Nationals 2025 | 3:28.30, 2:47.94, 3:18.71 |
| 7 | (United States) Graham Siggins | 3:37.44 | (United States) La La Land 2024 | 3:31.41, 3:39.14, 3:41.76 |
| 8 | (South Korea) Yeon Kyun Park (박연균) | 3:52.27 | (South Korea) Korean Championship 2025 | 3:51.43, 3:36.36, 4:09.03 |
| 9 | (China) Zhe Wang (王哲) | 3:55.69 | (China) Please Be Quiet Xi'an 2024 | 3:11.58, 4:02.65, 4:32.84 |
| 10 | (Sweden) Daniel Wallin | 4:03.98 | (Sweden) Headache in Kode 2026 | 5:27.97, 3:34.89, 3:09.09 |

== In popular culture ==
- A Filipino TV series from ABS-CBN Entertainment named Little Big Shots shows a 10-year old cuber named Franco, who solved a 5×5×5 cube in 1 minute and 47.12 seconds.
- In the movie Line Walker 2: Invisible Spy, two children are shown solving the 5×5×5 cube. They compete to solve multiple cubes consecutively, blindfolded, known as "5×5×5 multi-blind" by speedcubers.

== See also ==
- Pocket Cube – A 2×2×2 version of the puzzle
- Rubik's Cube – The 3×3×3 original version of this puzzle
- Rubik's Revenge – A 4×4×4 version of the puzzle
- V-Cube 6 - A 6×6×6 version of the puzzle
- V-Cube 7 - A 7×7×7 version of the puzzle
- V-Cube 8 - An 8×8×8 version of the puzzle
- Speedcubing
- Combination puzzle
