= V-cube 6 =

6×6×6 Rubik's Cube

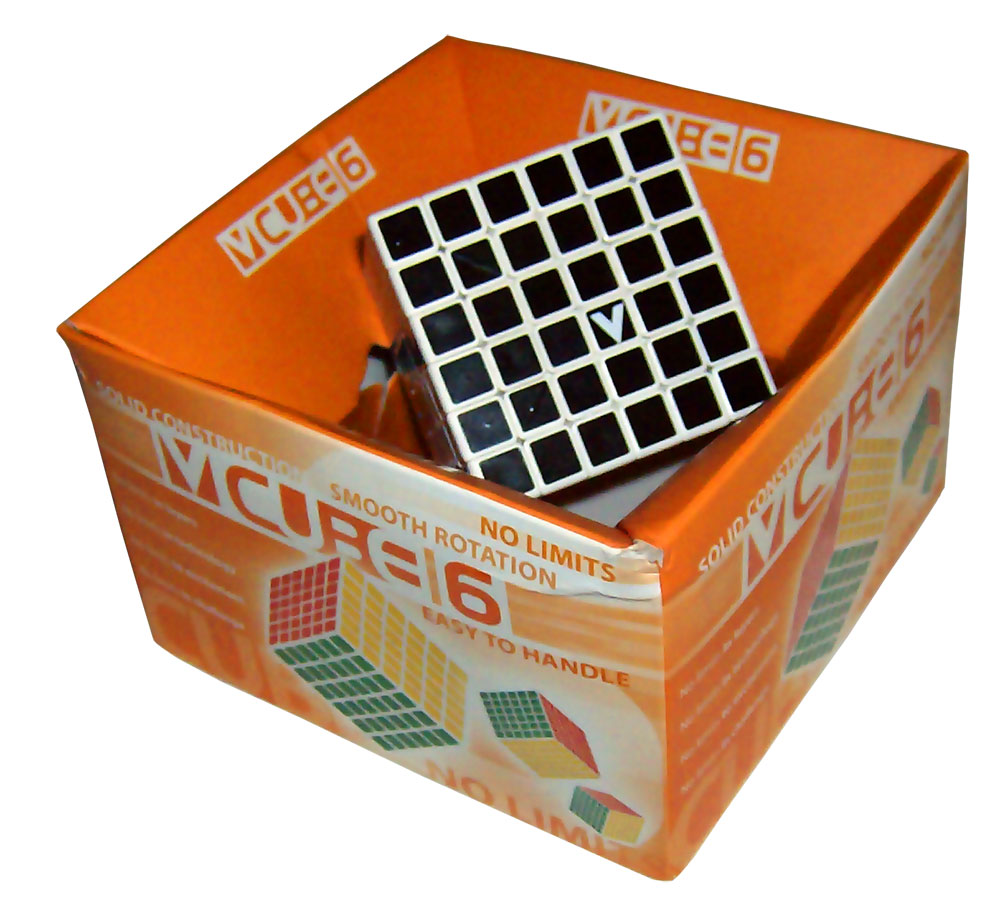
V-Cube 6 in original packaging

The V-Cube 6 is a 6×6×6 version of the original Rubik's Cube. The first mass-produced 6×6×6 was invented by Panagiotis Verdes and is produced by the Greek company Verdes Innovations SA. Other such puzzles have since been introduced by a number of Chinese companies, most of which have mechanisms which improve on the original. Unlike the original puzzle (but like the 4×4×4 cube), it has no fixed facets: the center facets (16 per face) are free to move to different positions.

Methods for solving the 3×3×3 cube work for the edges and corners of the 6×6×6 cube, as long as one has correctly identified the relative positions of the colors — since the center facets can no longer be used for identification.

== Mechanics ==
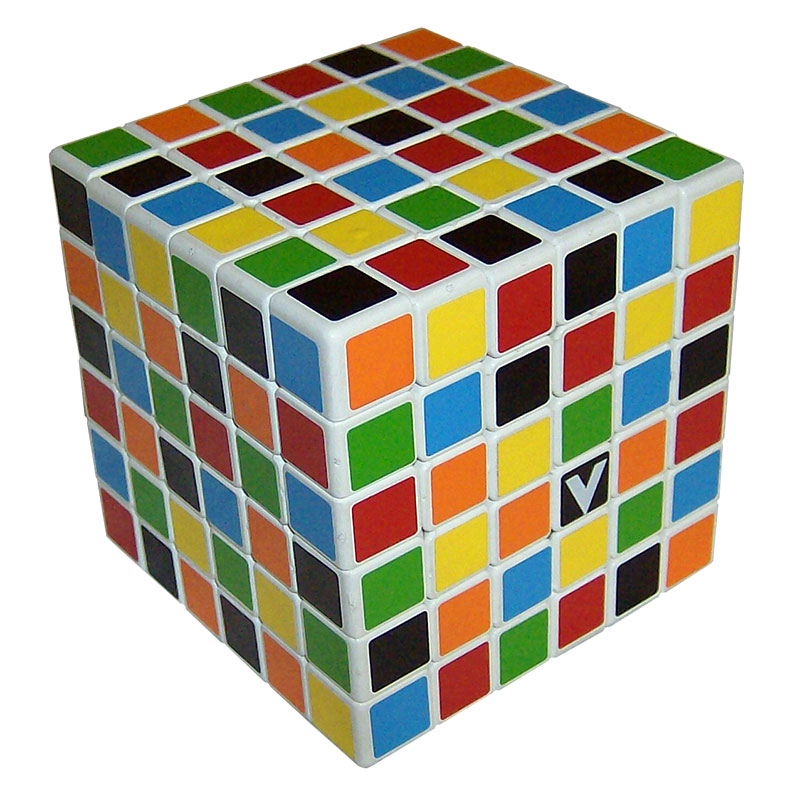
Scrambled V-Cube 6

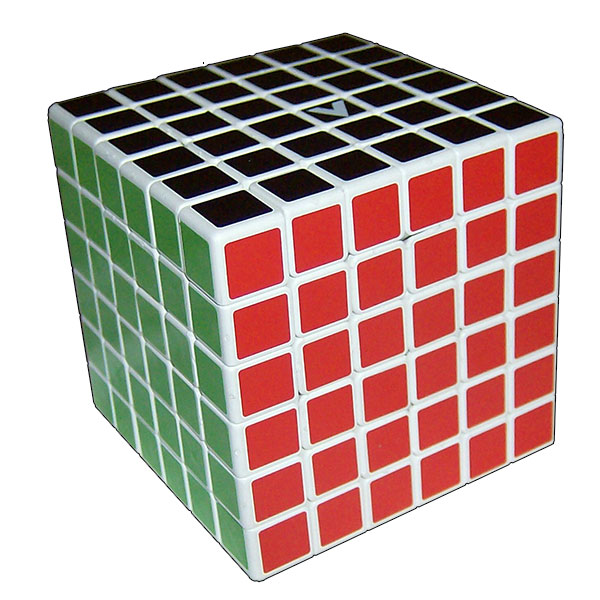
Solved V-Cube 6

The puzzle consists of 152 pieces ("cubies") on the surface. There are also 66 pieces (60 movable, 6 fixed, and a central "spider" frame) entirely hidden within the interior of the cube. The V-Cube 7 uses essentially the same mechanism, except that on the latter these hidden pieces (corresponding to the center rows) are made visible.

There are 96 center pieces which show one color each, 48 edge pieces which show two colors each, and eight corner pieces which show three colors. Each piece (or quartet of edge pieces) shows a unique color combination, but not all combinations are present (for example, there is no edge piece with both red and orange sides, since red and orange are on opposite sides of the solved Cube). The location of these cubes relative to one another can be altered by twisting the layers of the Cube 90°, 180° or 270°, but the location of the colored sides relative to one another in the completed state of the puzzle cannot be altered: it is fixed by the distribution of color combinations on the edge and corner pieces.

The V-Cube 6 is produced with white plastic as a base, with red opposite orange, blue opposite green, and yellow opposite black. One center piece is branded with the letter V. Verdes also sells a version with black plastic and a white face, with the other colors remaining the same.

Unlike the rounded V-Cube 7, the original V-Cube 6 has flat faces. The outermost pieces are slightly wider than those in the center. This subtle difference allows the use of a thicker stalk to hold the corner pieces to the internal mechanism, thus making the puzzle more durable. The original V-Cube 6 incorporates a clicking mechanism designed to keep the hidden middle layer in alignment with the rest of the pieces. The V-Cube 6b, with the same pillowed shape as the V-Cube 7, was introduced later with a modified internal mechanism.

== Permutations ==
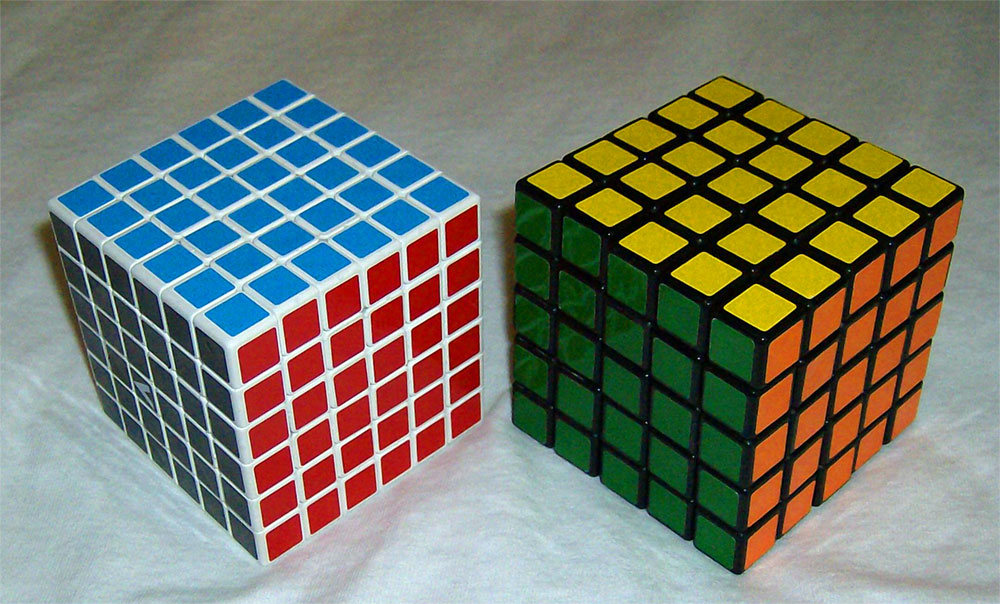
The V-Cube 6 is roughly the same size as the official Professor's Cube.

There are 8 corners, 48 edges and 96 centers.

Any permutation of the corners is possible, including odd permutations. Seven of the corners can be independently rotated, and the orientation of the eighth depends on the other seven, giving 8!×3^{7} combinations.

There are 96 centers, consisting of four sets of 24 pieces each. Within each set, there are four centers of each color. Centers from one set cannot be exchanged with those from another set. Each set can be arranged in 24! different ways. Assuming that the four centers of each color in each set are indistinguishable, the number of permutations is reduced to 24!/(24^{6}) arrangements. The reducing factor comes about because there are 24 (4!) ways to arrange the four pieces of a given color. This is raised to the sixth power because there are six colors. The total number of center permutations is the permutations of a single set raised to the fourth power, 24!^{4}/(24^{24}).

There are 48 edges, consisting of 24 inner and 24 outer edges. These cannot be flipped, due to the internal shape of the pieces, nor can an inner edge exchange places with an outer edge. The four edges in each matching quartet are distinguishable, since corresponding edges are mirror images of each other. Any permutation of the edges in each set is possible, including odd permutations, giving 24! arrangements for each set or 24!^{2} total, regardless of the position or orientation of any other pieces.

Assuming the cube does not have a fixed orientation in space, and that the permutations resulting from rotating the cube without twisting it are considered identical, the number of permutations is reduced by a factor of 24. This is because the 24 possible positions and orientations of the first corner are equivalent because of the lack of fixed centers. This factor does not appear when calculating the permutations of N×N×N cubes where N is odd, since those puzzles have fixed centers which identify the cube's spatial orientation.

This gives a total number of permutations of

$$\frac{8! \times 3^7 \times 24!^6}{24^{25}} \approx 1.57 \times 10^{116}$$

The entire number is 157 152 858 401 024 063 281 013 959 519 483 771 508 510 790 313 968 742 344 694 684 829 502 629 887 168 573 442 107 637 760 000 000 000 000 000 000 000 000 (around 157 novemdecillion on the long scale or 157 septentrigintillion on the short scale).

One of the center pieces is marked with a V, which distinguishes it from the other three in its set. This increases the number of patterns by a factor of four to 6.29×10^{116}, although any of the four possible positions for this piece could be regarded as correct.

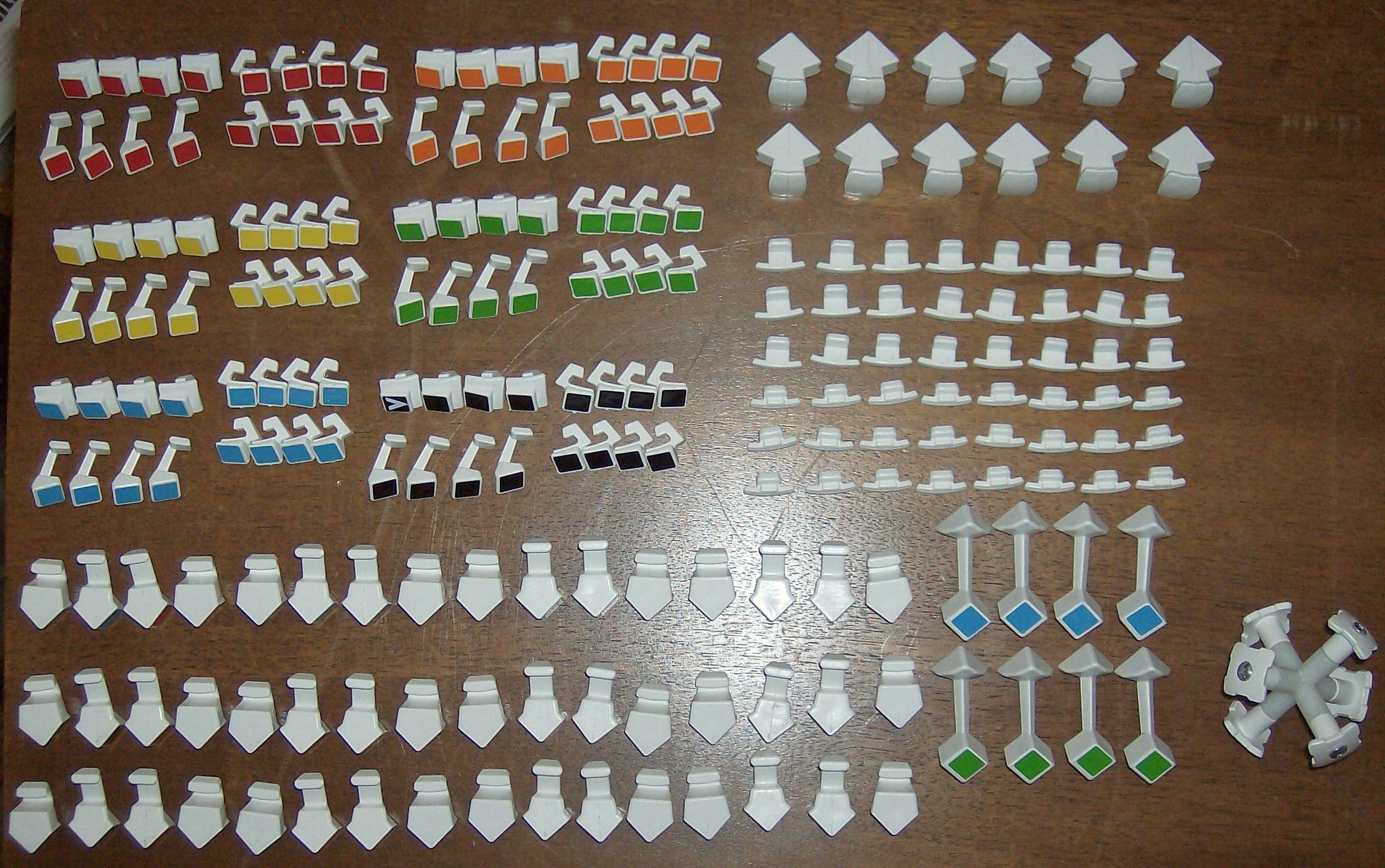
V-Cube 6 disassembled

== Solutions ==
There are numerous ways to solve the V-Cube 6. Some of the popular ones are given below.

=== Reduction method ===
The reduction method is a popular method among the speedcubing community. The method starts off by solving the 96 face centers, making sure that colors are properly placed relative to each other. The next step involves matching up quartets of edge pieces into solid strips. At this point, the cube is solved as if it were a very large 3×3×3 cube. However, parity errors are possible (described below), which cannot occur on the original 3×3×3 cube.

=== Yau method ===
The Yau method is another popular method. This has much in common with the reduction method, but involves performing some steps in a different order.

=== Cage method ===
The cage method differs in that the edges and corners are solved first. In some versions, the centers of two opposite faces are solved prior to this. The final step entails moving the remaining center pieces to the proper faces. This method avoids parity errors at the cost of efficiency.

=== Parity errors ===
Parity errors are positions that cannot be reached on the 3×3×3 Rubik's Cube. These have special algorithms to fix the parity. Such errors include having a single edge quartet "flipped", or having two edge quartets swapped.

== World records ==
The world record for single solve is 57.69 seconds, set by Max Park of the United States at Burbank Big Cubes 2025 in Burbank, California.

The world record for mean of three solves is 1 minute, 1.76 seconds, set by Timofei Tarasenko of Russia at Beijing Autumn Rivalry 2026 in Beijing, China, with times of 1:02.64, 1:01.63, and 1:01.00.

=== Top 10 solvers by single solve ===
Rank	Name	Result	Competition
1	(United States) Max Park	57.69s	(United States) Burbank Big Cubes 2025
2	(Russia) Timofei Tarasenko	59.51s	(Thailand) Paradise Place Open 2026
3	(Poland) Tymon Kolasiński	59.84s	(China) Beijing Autumn Rivalry 2026
4	(South Korea) Seung Hyuk Nahm (남승혁)	1:00.08	(China) Beijing Autumn Rivalry 2026
5	(Vietnam) Đỗ Quang Hưng	1:00.77	(United States) Lakewood Spring 2026
6	(Singapore) Emmanuel Kao	1:01.23	Singapore Polytechnic September Showdown 2026
7	(China) Ziyu Wu (吴子钰)	1:01.79	(China) Start of Summer Beijing 2026
8	(Malaysia) Lim Hung (林弘)	1:02.16	(Vietnam) MYHM HaNxNoi 2026
9	(United States) Henry Lichner	1:03.43	(United States) Rubik's WCA World Championship 2025
10	(South Africa) Daniel Rush	1:03.89	(South Africa) Cubestuff Challenge Centurion Q4 2026

=== Top 10 solvers by mean of three solves ===
Rank	Name	Result	Competition	Times
1	(Russia) Timofei Tarasenko	1:01.76	(China) Beijing Autumn Rivalry 2026	1:02.64, 1:01.63, 1:01.00
2	(Malaysia) Lim Hung (林弘)	1:04.94	(Malaysia) UniKL MIAT Cube Open 2026	1:08.11, 1:03.68, 1:03.04
3	(United States) Max Park	1:05.04	(United States) Nub Open Trabuco Hills Fall 2025	1:04.60, 1:04.80, 1:05.73
4	(Poland) Tymon Kolasiński	1:05.78	(United States) 4x4 Off US-40 IL 2026	1:03.93, 1:05.72, 1:07.70
5	(South Korea) Seung Hyuk Nahm (남승혁)	1:06.46	(South Korea) Daegu Cold Winter 2024	1:08.52, 1:02.67, 1:08.18
6	(China) Ziyu Wu (吴子钰)	1:06.78	(China) Start of Summer Beijing 2026	1:06.28, 1:12.27, 1:01.79
7	(Vietnam) Đỗ Quang Hưng	1:07.77	(Vietnam) NxN in Hanoi 2025	1:07.83, 1:07.88, 1:07.60
8	(Singapore) Emmanuel Kao	1:08.27	Singapore Mega November 2026	1:06.64, 1:08.18, 1:09.98
9	(Republic of Ireland) Ciarán Beahan	1:09.67	(United Kingdom) Manchester 5x5 Day 2025	1:10.68, 1:10.11, 1:08.23
10	(United States) Henry Lichner	1:10.64	(United States) Machesney Park Fall 2025	1:10.76, 1:15.76, 1:05.39

== In popular culture ==
- In the movie Snowden, a 6×6×6 cube, specifically a V-Cube 6, is seen, along with the standard Rubik's Cube and its variants in Hank Forrester's puzzle collection.

== See also ==
- Pocket Cube (2×2×2)
- Rubik's Cube (3×3×3)
- Rubik's Revenge (4×4×4)
- Professor's Cube (5×5×5)
- V-Cube 7 (7×7×7)
- V-Cube 8 (8×8×8)
- Combination puzzles
