= V-Cube 7 =

Larger variant of the Rubik's cube

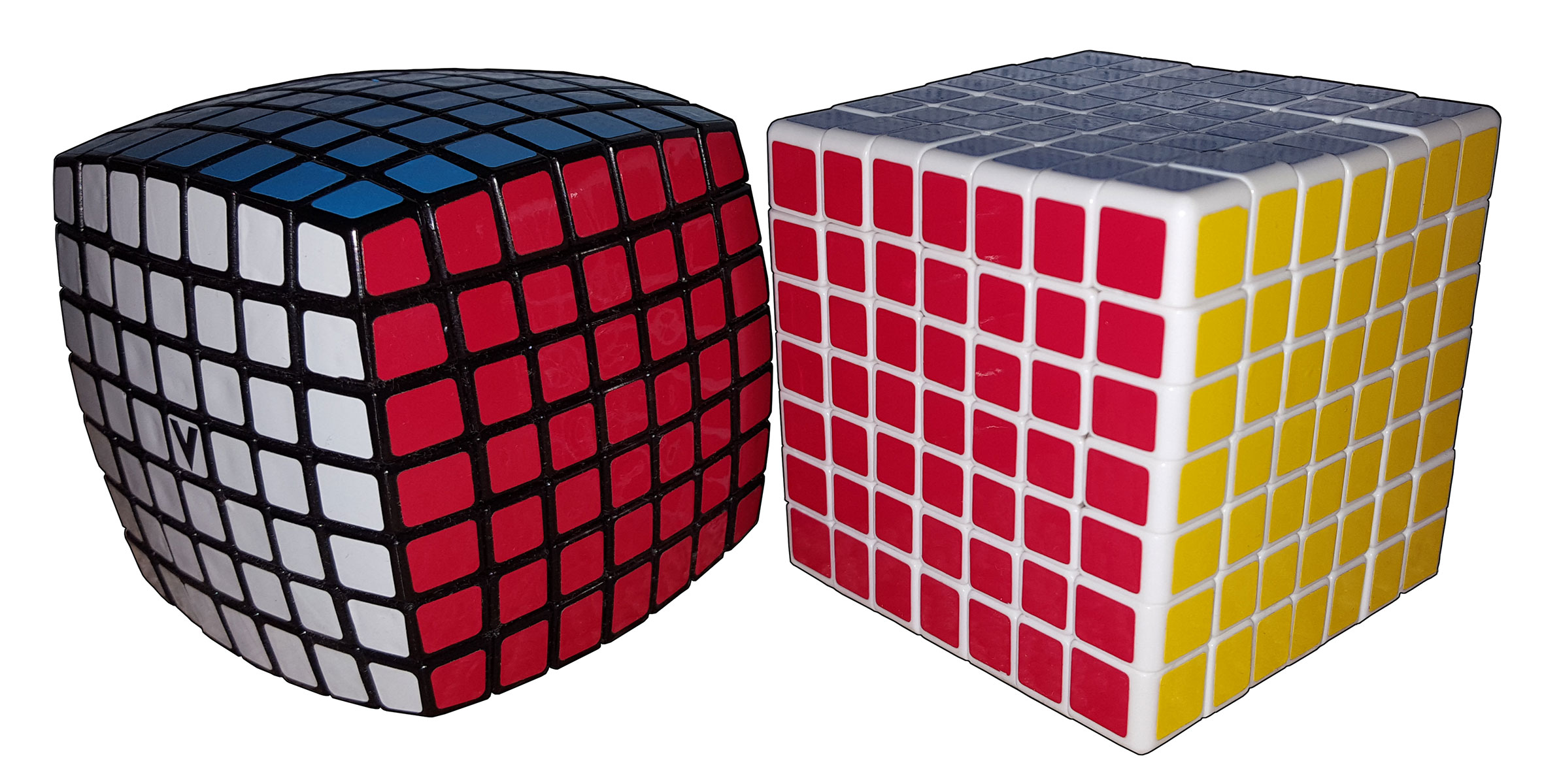
V-Cube 7 (left), Shengshou 7×7 (right)

The V-Cube 7 is a combination puzzle in the form of a 7×7×7 cube. The first mass-produced 7×7×7 was invented by Panagiotis Verdes and is produced by the Greek company Verdes Innovations SA. Other such puzzles have since been introduced by a number of Chinese companies, most of which have mechanisms which improve on the original. Like the 5×5×5, the V-Cube 7 has both fixed and movable center facets.

== Mechanics ==
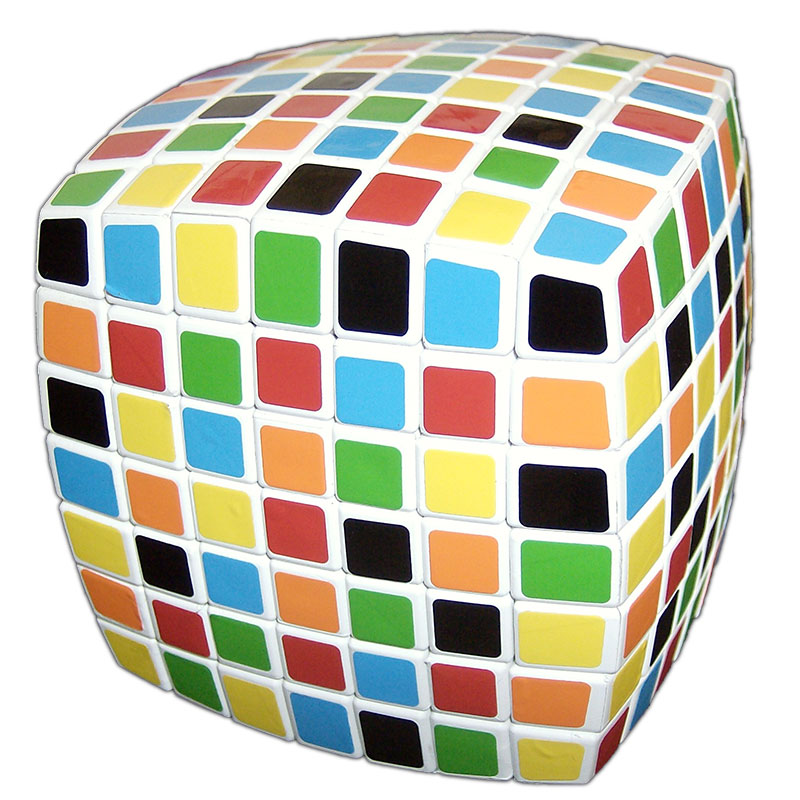
Scrambled V-Cube 7

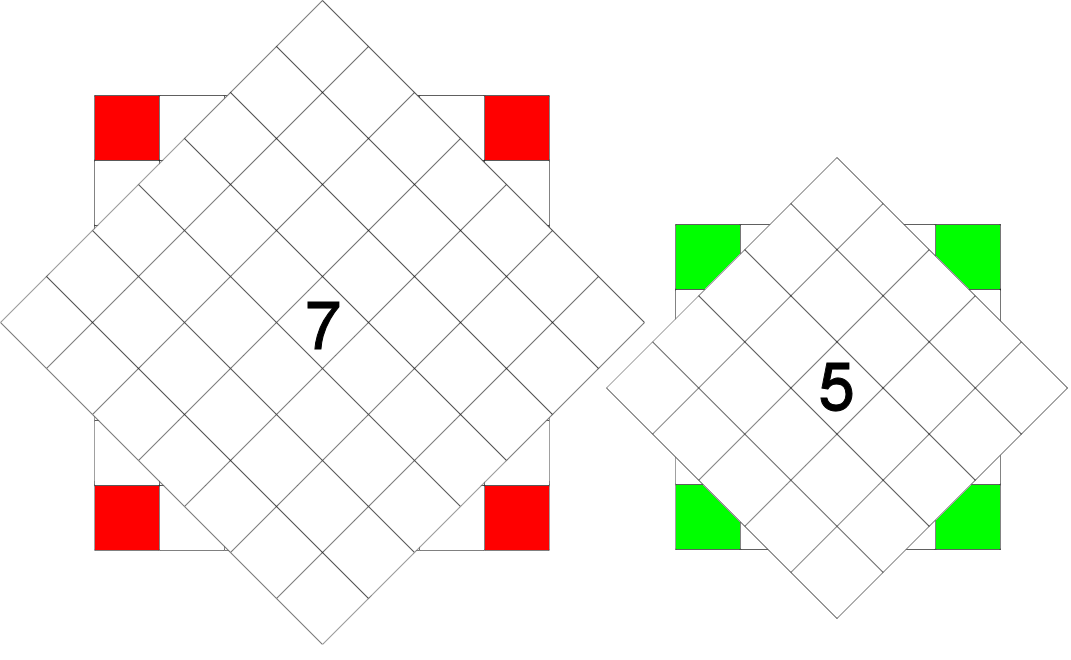
Issue with corners in a large cube

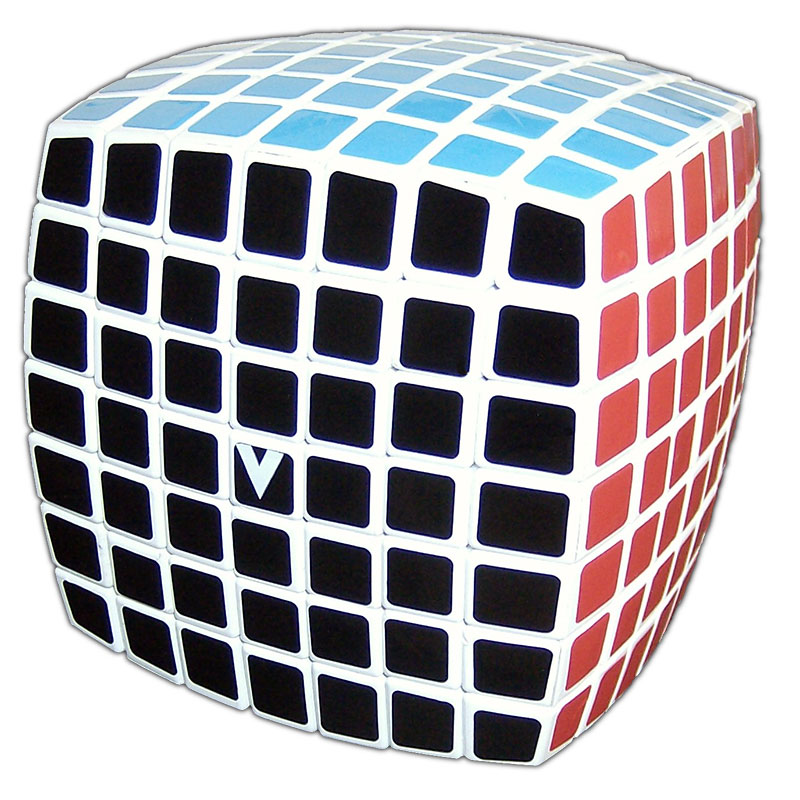
Solved V-Cube 7

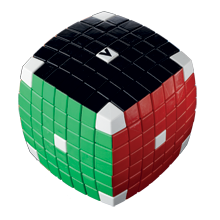
V-Cube 7 Dazzler

The puzzle consists of 218 unique miniature cubes ("cubies") on the surface. Six of these (the central tiles of the six faces) are attached directly to the internal "spider" frame and are fixed in position relative to one another. The V-Cube 6 uses essentially the same mechanism, except that on the latter the central rows, which hold the rest of the pieces together, are completely hidden.

There are 150 center pieces which show one color each, 60 edge pieces which show two colors each, and eight corner pieces which show three colors each. Each piece (or quintet of edge pieces) shows a unique color combination, but not all combinations are present (for example, there is no piece with both red and orange sides, since red and orange are on opposite sides of the solved Cube). The location of these cubes relative to one another can be altered by twisting the outer layers of the Cube 90°, 180° or 270°, but the location of the colored sides relative to one another in the completed state of the puzzle cannot be altered: it is fixed by the relative positions of the fixed center squares and the distribution of color combinations on edge and corner pieces.

Currently, the V-Cube 7 is produced with white plastic as a base, with red opposite orange, blue opposite green, and yellow opposite black. Verdes and other manufacturers also sell cubes with black plastic and a white face, with the other colors remaining the same, and solid plastic versions with the plastic the colour itself and no stickers. The fixed black or white center piece is branded with the logo of the manufacturer, which is V on cubes by Verdes. Flag variations of 7×7s including Germany, Poland and Russia, are also sold by Verdes.

Unlike the flat-sided V-Cube 6, the V-Cube 7 is noticeably rounded. This departure from a true cube shape is necessary, since the mechanism used on this puzzle would not function properly with layers of identical thickness. Other means (such as magnets) would be required. Note from the image at right that if a 7×7×7 were to be constructed with layers of identical thickness the corner pieces (shown in red) would lose contact with the rest of the puzzle when a side was rotated 45 degrees. The V-Cube 6 and V-Cube 7 both solve the problem by using thicker outer layers. The rounded shape of the V-Cube 7 results in corner stickers that are similar in size to the center stickers, which helps hide the unequal thickness.

Cubes from other manufacturers can be found with rounded or flat sides, but all use thicker outer layers.

=== Permutations ===
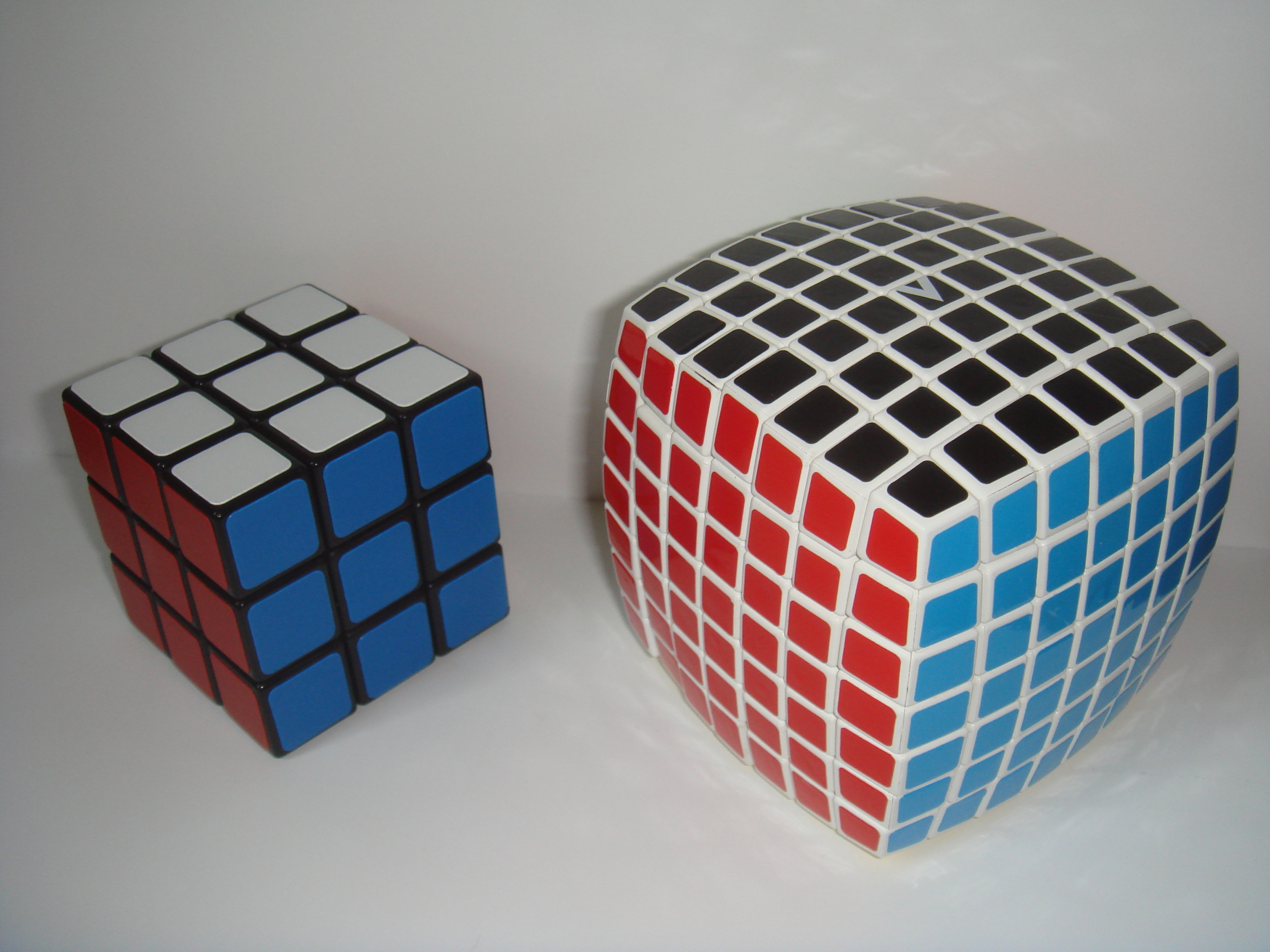
A size comparison between an original size 3×3×3 cube, and a 7×7×7 V-Cube 7

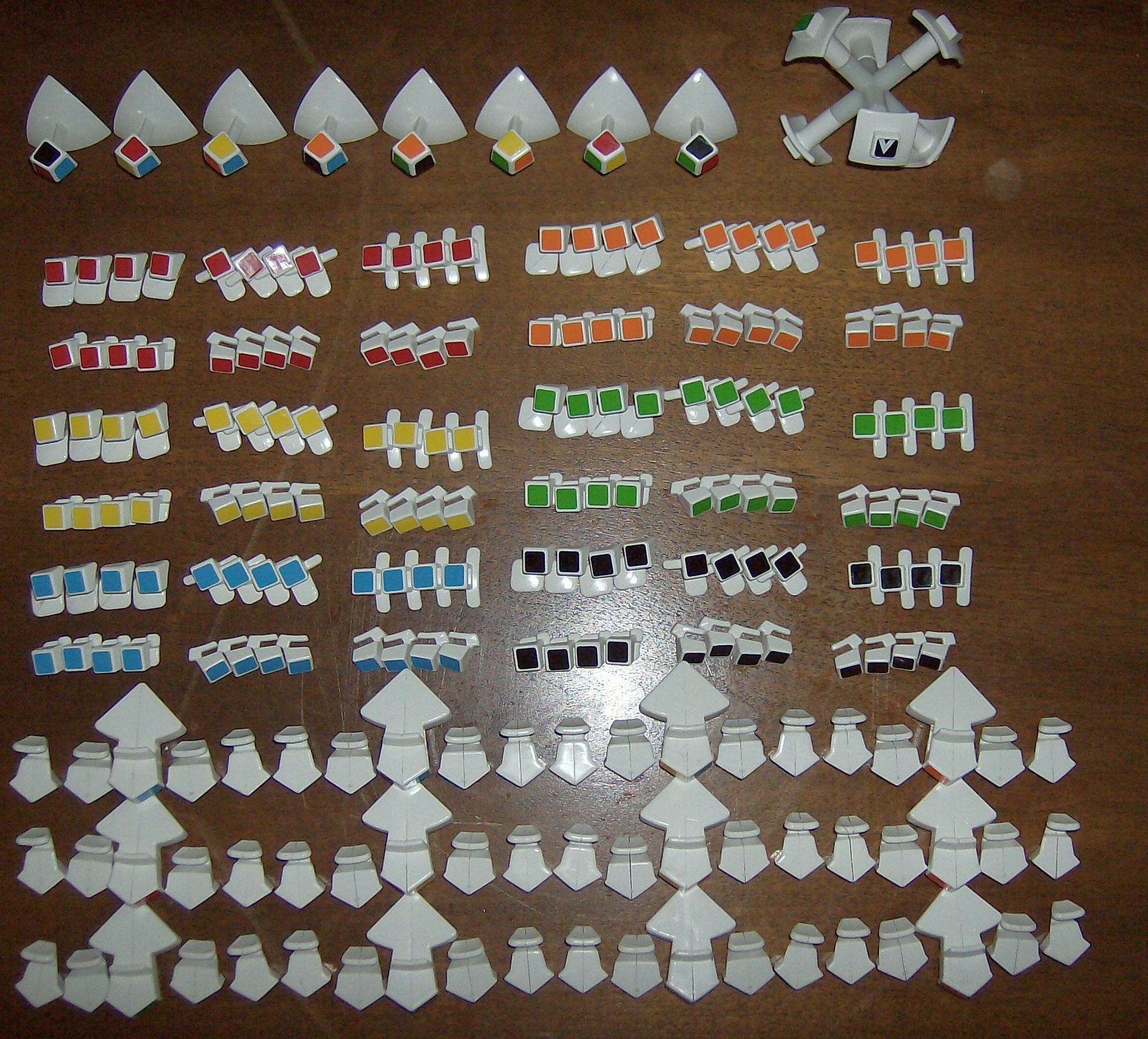
Disassembled

There are 8 corner "cubies", 60 edges and 150 centers (6 fixed, 144 movable).

Any permutation of the corners is possible, including odd permutations. Seven of the corners can be independently rotated, and the orientation of the eighth depends on the other seven, giving 8!×3^{7} combinations.

There are 144 movable centers, consisting of six sets of 24 pieces each. Within each set there are four centers of each color. Centers from one set cannot be exchanged with those from another set. Each set can be arranged in 24! different ways. Assuming that the four centers of each color in each set are indistinguishable, the number of permutations of each set is reduced to 24!/(24^{6}) arrangements, all of which are possible. The reducing factor comes about because there are 24 (4!) ways to arrange the four pieces of a given color. This is raised to the sixth power because there are six colors. The total number of permutations of all movable centers is the permutations of a single set raised to the sixth power, 24!^{6}/(24^{36}).

There are 60 edge pieces, consisting of 12 central, 24 intermediate, and 24 outer edges. The central edges can be flipped but the rest cannot, due to the internal shape of the pieces, nor can an edge from one set exchange places with one from another set. The five edges in each matching quintet are distinguishable, since corresponding non-central edges are mirror images of each other. There are 12!/2 ways to arrange the central edges, since an odd permutation of the corners implies an odd permutation of these pieces as well. There are 2^{11} ways that they can be flipped, since the orientation of the twelfth edge depends on the preceding eleven. Any permutation of the intermediate and outer edges is possible, including odd permutations, giving 24! arrangements for each set or 24!^{2} total, regardless of the position or orientation of any other pieces.

This gives a total number of permutations of

$$\frac{8! \times 3^7 \times 12! \times 2^{10} \times 24!^8}{24^{36}} \approx 1.95 \times 10^{160}$$

The entire number is 19 500 551 183 731 307 835 329 126 754 019 748 794 904 992 692 043 434 567 152 132 912 323 232 706 135 469 180 065 278 712 755 853 360 682 328 551 719 137 311 299 993 600 000 000 000 000 000 000 000 000 000 000 000 (roughly 19,501 sexvigintillion or 19.5 sexvigintilliard on the long scale or 19.5 duoquinquagintillion on the short scale).

One of the fixed center pieces is usually marked with the logo of the manufacturer, such as V on a V-Cube. This center piece can be oriented in four different ways, which increases the number of patterns by a factor of four to 7.80×10^{160}. Any orientation of the fixed center piece is usually regarded as solved.

== Solution ==
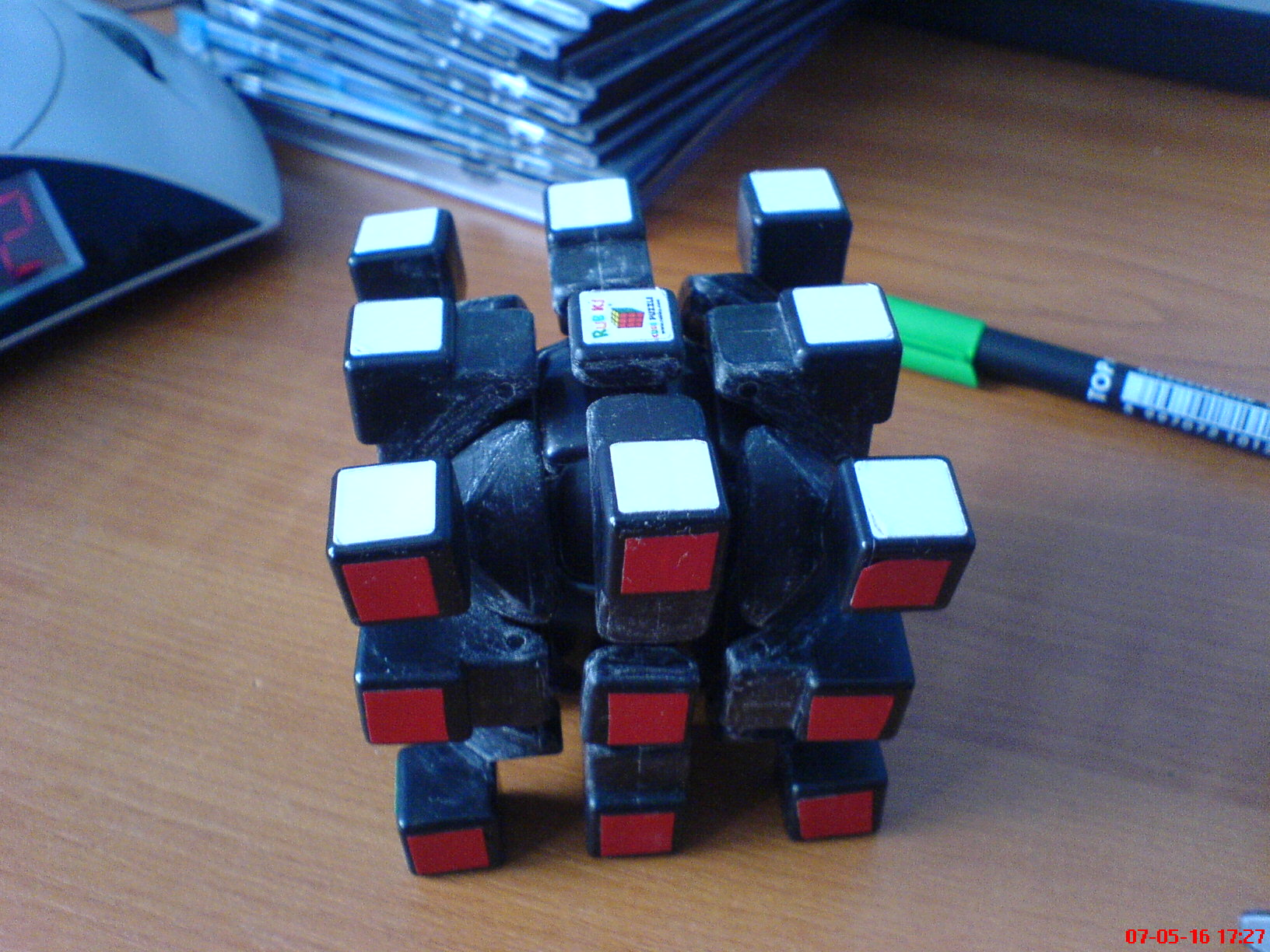
An original Professor's Cube with many of the pieces removed shows the 3×3×3 equivalence of the remaining pieces. The same principle applies to the V-Cube 7.

The most common strategy involves grouping similar edge pieces into solid strips, and centers into one-colored blocks. This allows the cube to be quickly solved with the same methods one would use for a 3×3×3 cube. Because the permutations of the corners, central edges and fixed centers have the same parity restrictions as the 3×3×3 cube, once reduction is complete the parity errors seen on the 4×4×4 and 6×6×6 cannot occur on the 7×7×7. However, it is still possible to get a parity where certain edges in the last edge that is grouped are flipped, and to solve this a slightly modified parity algorithm is used to rotate them.

Another strategy is to solve the edges of the cube first. The corners can be placed just as they are in any previous order of cube puzzle, and the centers are manipulated with an algorithm similar to the one used in the 4×4×4 cube. However, this method is very rarely used and is often less move-efficient.

== Records ==
The world record fastest solve is 1:27.47 seconds, set by Timofei Tarasenk from Russia on 30-2nd September at Beijing Autumn Rivalry 2026 in Beijing, China.

The world record mean of three solves is held by Timofei Tarasenko of Russia with a time of 1:36.80, set on 26-27th September, 2026 at Hanoi Big Cubes 2026 in Hanoi, Vietnam, with the times of 1:38.11, 1:40.67, and 1:31.63.

=== Top 10 solvers by single solve ===
Rank	Name	Result	Competition
1	(Russia) Timofei Tarasenko	1:27.47	(China) Beijing Autumn Rivalry 2026
2	(United States) Max Park	1:30.59	(United States) Rubik's WCA North American Championship 2026
3	(Poland) Tymon Kolasiński	1:32.69	(United States) Elmsford Extravaganza III 2026
4	(Malaysia) Lim Hung (林弘)	1:32.92	(Malaysia) UniKL MIAT Cube Open 2026
5	(South Korea) Seung Hyuk Nahm (남승혁)	1:33.11	(Indonesia) Balam Cubes Bekasi Comeback 2026
6	(China) Ziyu Wu (吴子钰)	1:33.60	(China) Beijing Autumn Rivalry 2026
7	(Vietnam) Đỗ Quang Hưng	1:33.75	(Vietnam) Hanoi Big Cubes 2026
8	(South Korea) DongSoo Park (박동수)	1:36.79	(South Korea) Please Big Cubes Korea 2025
9	(Singapore) Emmanuel Kao	1:36.86	Singapore Augu-Skewb Day 2026
10	(United States) Jack Pfeifer	1:37.08	(United States) Hancock County NxNs 2026

=== Top 10 solvers by mean of 3 solves ===
Rank	Name	Result	Competition	Times
1	(Russia) Timofei Tarasenko	1:35.93	(China) Beijing Autumn Rivalry 2026	1:37.95, 1:27.47, 1:42.37
2	(United States) Max Park	1:36.86	(United States) Nub Open Trabuco Hills Fall 2025	1:33.48, 1:41.36, 1:35.75
3	(China) Ziyu Wu (吴子钰)	1:38.77	(China) Beijing Autumn Rivalry 2026	1:40.66, 1:33.60, 1:42.05
4	(Malaysia) Lim Hung (林弘)	1:40.65	(Malaysia) UniKL MIAT Cube Open 2026	1:32.92, 1:50.69, 1:38.35
5	(South Korea) Seung Hyuk Nahm (남승혁)	1:40.67	(South Korea) Korea Open 2026	1:47.96, 1:35.31, 1:38.74
6	(Singapore) Emmanuel Kao	1:41.24	Singapore Jumbo June 2025	1:38.39, 1:42.46, 1:42.87
7	(Vietnam) Đỗ Quang Hưng	1:41.29	(Vietnam) Hanoi Big Cubes 2026	1:46.81, 1:43.30, 1:33.75
8	(Poland) Tymon Kolasiński	1:41.43	(United States) Elmsford Extravaganza III 2026	1:46.63, 1:32.69, 1:44.96
9	(Canada) Omar Ellabban	1:43.53	(Canada) Pickering NxNxN Winter 2026	1:47.11, 1:46.14, 1:37.34
10	(South Korea) DongSoo Park (박동수)	1:44.48	(South Korea) Seoul Winter 2026	1:44.30, 1:45.43, 1:43.70

== See also ==
- Pocket Cube (2×2×2)
- Rubik's Cube (3×3×3)
- Rubik's Revenge (4×4×4)
- Professor's Cube (5×5×5)
- V-Cube 6 (6×6×6)
- V-Cube 8 (8×8×8)
- Combination puzzles
