= Max Park =

American speedcuber (born 2001)

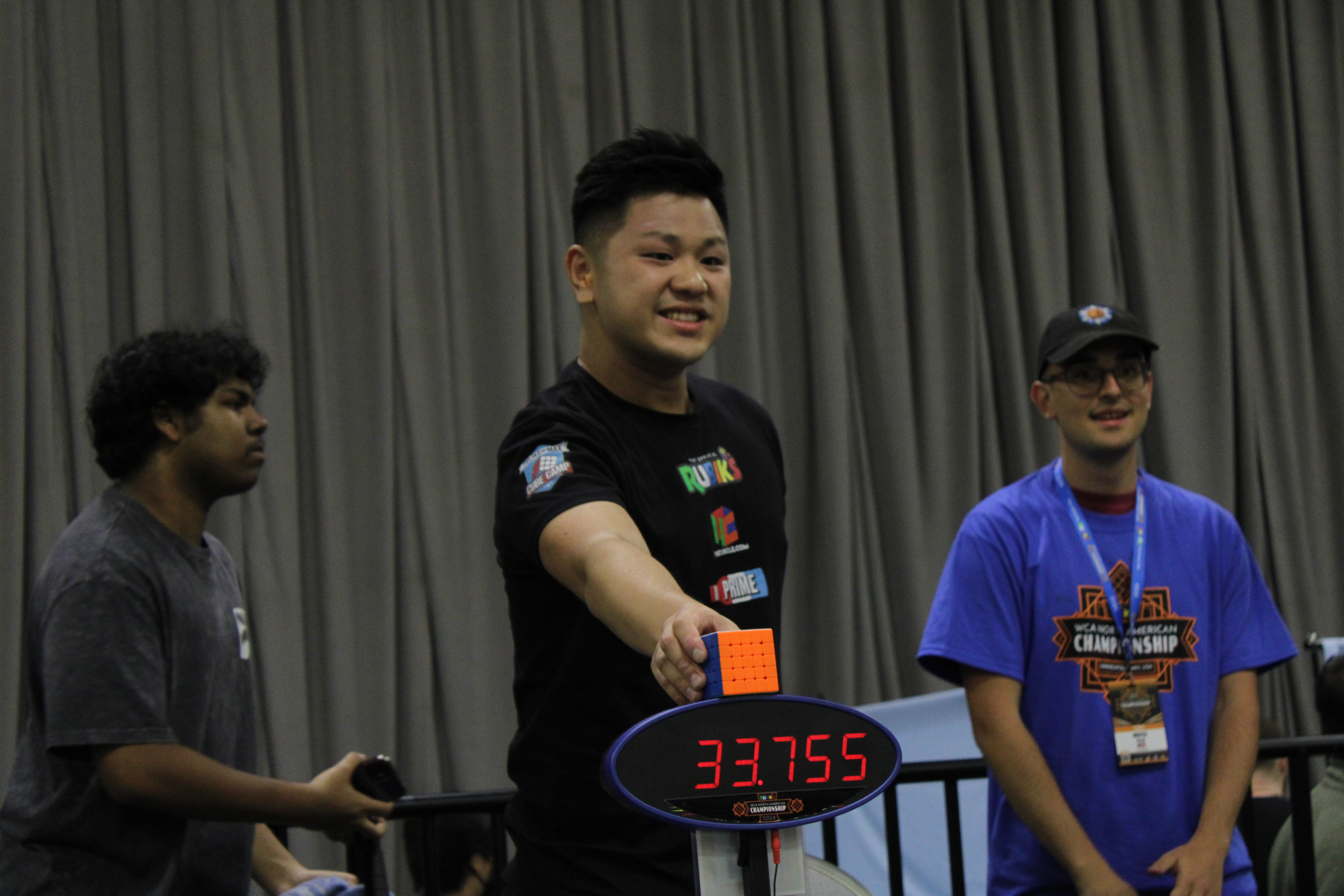
- Park in 2024 (North American championship)
- Born: November 28, 2001 (age 24); Cerritos, California, US
- Occupation: Speedcuber
- Known for: Rubik's Cube speedcubing
Medal record
Representing United States
Speedcubing
WCA World Championship
Event	1st	2nd	3rd
3x3x3	2	0	0
4x4x4	1	0	1
5x5x5	2	1	1
6x6x6	2	0	1
7x7x7	3	0	0
3x3x3 One-Handed	2	1	0
Total	12	2	3
Gold medal – first place	2017 Paris	3x3x3
Gold medal – first place	2017 Paris	3x3x3 One-Handed
Gold medal – first place	2019 Melbourne	4x4x4
Gold medal – first place	2019 Melbourne	5x5x5
Gold medal – first place	2019 Melbourne	6x6x6
Gold medal – first place	2019 Melbourne	7x7x7
Gold medal – first place	2019 Melbourne	3x3x3 One-Handed
Gold medal – first place	2023 Incheon	3x3x3
Gold medal – first place	2023 Incheon	5x5x5
Gold medal – first place	2023 Incheon	7x7x7
Gold medal – first place	2025 Seattle	6x6x6
Gold medal – first place	2025 Seattle	7x7x7
Silver medal – second place	2025 Seattle	3x3x3 One-Handed
Silver medal – second place	2025 Seattle	5x5x5
Bronze medal – third place	2017 Paris	6x6x6
Bronze medal – third place	2023 Incheon	4x4x4
Bronze medal – third place	2023 Incheon	5x5x5
US National Championship
Event	1st	2nd	3rd
3x3x3	3	0	2
4x4x4	5	0	0
5x5x5	4	1	0
6x6x6	3	2	0
7x7x7	3	1	1
3x3x3 One-Handed	4	0	1
Total	22	4	4
Gold medal – first place	2016 Portland, OR	4x4x4
Gold medal – first place	2017 Fort Wayne, IN	3x3x3
Gold medal – first place	2017 Fort Wayne, IN	4x4x4
Gold medal – first place	2017 Fort Wayne, IN	5x5x5
Gold medal – first place	2017 Fort Wayne, IN	3x3x3 One-Handed
Gold medal – first place	2018 Salt Lake City, UT	3x3x3
Gold medal – first place	2018 Salt Lake City, UT	4x4x4
Gold medal – first place	2018 Salt Lake City, UT	5x5x5
Gold medal – first place	2018 Salt Lake City, UT	6x6x6
Gold medal – first place	2018 Salt Lake City, UT	7x7x7
Gold medal – first place	2018 Salt Lake City, UT	3x3x3 One-Handed
Gold medal – first place	2019 Baltimore, MD	4x4x4
Gold medal – first place	2019 Baltimore, MD	5x5x5
Gold medal – first place	2019 Baltimore, MD	6x6x6
Gold medal – first place	2019 Baltimore, MD	7x7x7
Gold medal – first place	2019 Baltimore, MD	3x3x3 One-Handed
Gold medal – first place	2023 Pittsburgh, PA	3x3x3
Gold medal – first place	2023 Pittsburgh, PA	4x4x4
Gold medal – first place	2023 Pittsburgh, PA	5x5x5
Gold medal – first place	2023 Pittsburgh, PA	6x6x6
Gold medal – first place	2023 Pittsburgh, PA	7x7x7
Gold medal – first place	2023 Pittsburgh, PA	3x3x3 One-Handed
Silver medal – second place	2016 Portland, OR	5x5x5
Silver medal – second place	2016 Portland, OR	6x6x6
Silver medal – second place	2016 Portland, OR	7x7x7
Silver medal – second place	2017 Fort Wayne, IN	6x6x6
Bronze medal – third place	2016 Portland, OR	3x3x3
Bronze medal – third place	2016 Portland, OR	3x3x3 One-Handed
Bronze medal – third place	2017 Fort Wayne, IN	7x7x7
Bronze medal – third place	2019 Baltimore, MD	3x3x3

Korean name
- Hangul: 박상현
- Hanja: 朴相炫
- Revised Romanization: Bak Sanghyeon
- McCune–Reischauer: Pak Sanghyŏn

Max Park (born November 28, 2001) is a Korean-American speedcuber. He is one of only two speedcubers ever to win the 3x3 cube event at the World Cube Association (WCA) World Championship twice (the other being Feliks Zemdegs), winning in 2017 and 2023. As of October 2026, he holds the world record for the fastest 6×6×6 single.

Max Park was one of the primary subjects of the 2020 Netflix documentary The Speed Cubers.

== Cubing career ==
Park began cubing at age ten and attended his first competition the same year in Los Angeles. At his second ever competition, he won the 6×6×6 event. He continued competing and improving, winning his first gold medal in the 3×3×3 event at Nub Open 2016. On February 25, 2017, he broke the North American record average for the 3×3×3 event, with an average of 6.92 seconds. Two months later on April 23, 2017, Park would break the World Record Average for the 3×3×3 event, with an average of 6.39 seconds.

At the World Championship 2017 in Paris, Park won 3×3×3 and 3×3×3 one-handed and placed 3rd in 5×5×5 and 6×6×6.

At the World Championship 2019 in Melbourne, Park won the 4×4×4, 5×5×5, 6×6×6, 7×7×7, and 3×3×3 one-handed events. He finished 4th in the 3×3×3 final after winning the first three rounds.

At the World Championship 2023 in Incheon, Park won the 3x3x3 (by 0.01 seconds), 5×5×5, and 7×7×7 events. He also placed 3rd in 4x4x4.

At the World Championship 2025 in Seattle, Park won the 6×6×6 and 7×7×7 events. He also placed 2nd in the 5×5×5 and 3×3×3 one-handed events. He got 8th place in the 3x3 event.

Park is a 3-time US National Champion in 3×3×3, 5-time champion in 4×4×4, 4-time champion in 5×5×5, 3-time champion in 6×6×6, 3-time champion in 7×7×7, and 4-time champion in 3×3×3 one-handed.

== Records held ==
=== 3×3×3 ===
Park held the world record for the average of five 3×3×3 solves on four occasions and set the former world record for a single 3×3×3 solve with a time of 3.13 seconds at Pride in Long Beach 2023. His average record was surpassed on March 12, 2023, when 9-year-old Yiheng Wang achieved a 4.69-second average at the Yong Jun KL Speedcubing 2023 event in Kuala Lumpur, Malaysia. Wang also surpassed Park's single world record with a time of 3.08 seconds at XMUM Cube Open 2025 in Sepang, Selangor, Malaysia.

=== 4×4×4 ===
Park holds the North American record for average of five 4×4×4 solves: 18.74 seconds, set at Mission Viejo 2025, and the former world record for a single solve with a time of 15.71, achieved at Colorado Mountain Tour, which was beaten by Tymon Kolasiński at the 2025 Spanish championships with a time of 15.18 seconds.

=== 5×5×5 ===
Prior to his first 5×5×5 record, the records for single and average of five 5×5×5 solves had been held by Feliks Zemdegs of Australia, who had improved the two records a combined 32 times.

=== 6×6×6 ===
Park holds the single 6×6×6 world record, at 57.69 seconds, achieved at Burbank Big Cubes 2025. He formerly held the world record mean of three 6×6×6 solves: 1:05.04, achieved at Nub Open Trabuco Hills Fall 2025. At Southeast Championship 2022, he became the first person to break the 1-minute barrier on 6×6×6 with a solve of 59.74, a feat that 2-time world champion Feliks Zemdegs had previously stated was impossible.

=== 7×7×7 ===
Park holds both former world record single world record mean of three 7×7×7 solves: 1:30.59 and 1:36.86 respectively. They were set at Rubik's WCA North American Championship 2026 and Nub Open Trabuco Hills Fall 2025.

=== 3×3×3 one-handed ===
Park previously held the world record for 3×3×3 one-handed average of five several times, but it is now held by Zhen Chen (陈震) from the China with a time of 6.99 seconds. Park was the first person to achieve a sub-10 second one-handed average in competition, with an average of 9.99 seconds on January 13, 2018 at Thanks Four The Invite 2018.

== Personal life ==
Park was diagnosed with autism as a toddler. He began cubing at age nine at the encouragement of his mother to improve issues with communication and fine motor skill.

== Notable rankings ==
Park's rankings as of 13 November 2026:

Event	Format	Time (sec)	World Rank	Continental Rank
3×3×3	Single	3.13	5	1
3×3×3	Ao5	4.86	15	2
4×4×4	Single	15.71	2	1
4×4×4	Ao5	18.74	2	1
5×5×5	Single	30.63	4	1
5×5×5	Ao5	34.65	3	1
6×6×6	Single	57.69	1	1
6×6×6	Mo3	1:05.04	3	1
7×7×7	Single	1:30.59	2	1
7×7×7	Mo3	1:36.86	2	1
3×3×3 one-handed	Single	6.20	12	2
3×3×3 one-handed	Ao5	7.94	4	2
