= Gilles Roux =

French speedcuber (born 1971)

Gilles Roux (born 20 January 1971) is a French speedcuber primarily known for inventing a 3x3x3 Rubik's Cube method, the Roux Method, and achieving fast times with it.

== World Cube Association ==
Gilles Roux was a member of the World Cube Association Board from October 2004 until 1 November 2008. During his time as a board member, Gilles helped organize many competitions as a WCA delegate. He also contributed to WCA by creating much needed regulations which would in turn help out cubers all over the world. Presently, Gilles is a technical advisor for the WCA and assists when needed.

== Roux method ==
Over a span of years, Gilles Roux developed his own method to solve the 3x3x3 cube. Using a smaller quantity of memorized algorithms than most methods of solving, Roux still found his method to be fast and efficient. The first step of the Roux method is to form a 3×2×1 block. The 3×2×1 block is usually placed in the lower portion of the left layer. The second step is to create another 3×2×1 on the opposite side. The remaining four corners are then solved using a set of algorithms known as CMLL (Corners of the Last Layer, without regards to the M-slice), which leaves six edges and four centers that are solved in the last step.

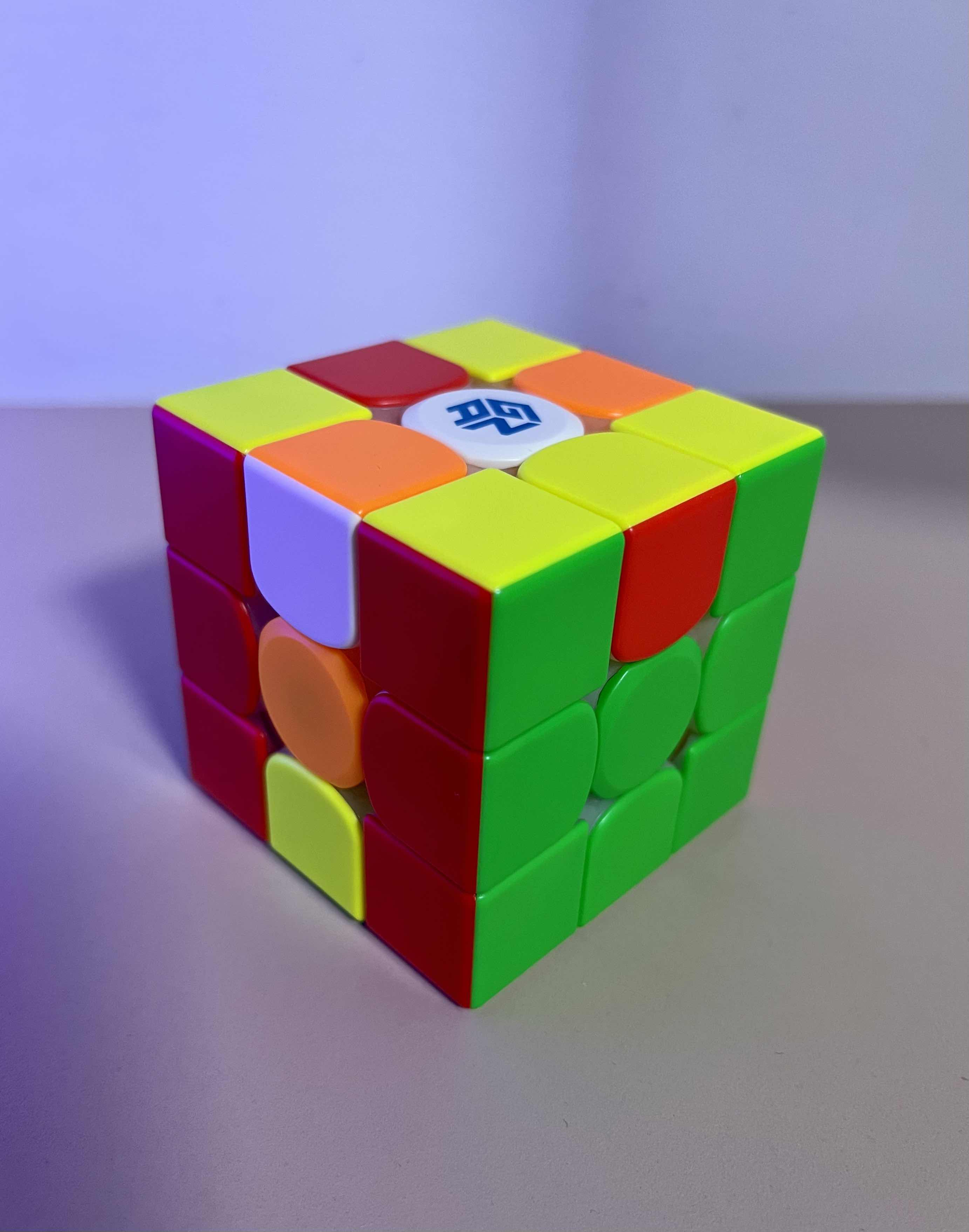
Roux method.

== Official results ==
For official results, solves must be completed in a competition held by the WCA. In competition, Gilles has recorded a single solve of 10.06 seconds, ranking him in the top twenty thousand solvers in the world (as of 1 January 2025). His best average of 5 was set on 16 September 2011 at 13.03. Also his greatest achieved fewest moves competition for the standard 3x3x3 is 31, being part of the "31 club", coming to a draw with another known cuber and creator of popular method of solving, Lars Petrus.

== See also ==
- Rubik's Cube
- Speedcubing
- Jessica Fridrich
- Lars Petrus
- World Cube Association
