= The Simple Solution to Rubik's Cube =

1981 book by James G. Nourse

- Author: James G. Nourse
- Illustrator: Dusan Krajan
- Language: English
- Publisher: Bantam Books
- Publication date: June 1981
- Media type: Print paperback
- Pages: 64
- ISBN: 0-553-14017-5
- OCLC: 7627746

The Simple Solution to Rubik's Cube by James G. Nourse is a book that was published in 1981. The book explains how to solve the Rubik's Cube. The book became the best-selling book of 1981, selling 6,680,000 copies that year. It was the fastest-selling title in the 36-year history of Bantam Books.

== Writing ==
Nourse wrote the book at the age of 33 while on the staff of the Chemistry Department at Stanford University. Shortly before Christmas 1980, he bought a Rubik's Cube intending to give it away as a present. Instead, he spent the holiday season working out a solution (a "Layer by Layer" method), which he published as a 32-page pamphlet for the university bookstore. It reached the hands of a publisher at Bantam who persuaded Nourse to expand the guide into a 64-page book.

== Publication ==
The book was published June 1981. It became the best-selling book of 1981, selling 6,680,000 copies that year. It was the fastest-selling title in the 36-year history of Bantam Books.

In November 1981, Nourse published a sequel, The Simple Solutions to Cubic Puzzles, as an aid to the numerous puzzles that were spawned by the Cube-craze.

== Content ==
The book begins with a summary of the history of the development of the Rubik's cube by Ernő Rubik and apparently independently by Terutoshi Ishige. Nourse claims his method has several features that distinguish it from others:

- It is guaranteed to work
- It offers clear and steady progress
- It presents few and uncomplicated decisions
- It allows for error
- It features a low number of easy to memorize sequences of moves
- It is independent of colour

The book's solution to the cube was considered to be one of the easiest, simplest, and most straightforward solutions to solving the cube.

== Other methods ==
Many later solutions to Rubik's Cube published on the internet seem to be based at least in part on the solution in this book.

The relatively few sequences one is required to memorize makes it one of the easiest solutions to remember – but this incurs the cost of a relatively high number of moves for a solution – about 100 moves average according to the book. The author claims he can solve random cube problems by this method in about 2 1/2 minutes.

However, this ease and simplicity involves a tradeoff in that this solution takes longer than other solutions that are harder and more complex.

=== Nomenclature ===
In his book, Nourse uses an original notation different from that of David Singmaster, which was not yet widely known in 1981. What Nourse calls T and B (for Top and Bottom respectively), became popularly known as U and D (Up and Down respectively). To avoid single-letter ambiguity, the rear face is called Posterior, represented by P (although none of the algorithms presented in the book actually uses the posterior face in its move sequences).

Clockwise and counterclockwise moves are made explicit with + and − (instead of relying on primes to denote counterclockwise, and their absence to denote clockwise).

Thus, for example, Nourse gives the algorithm for rotating three corners of the bottom face anticlockwise (solving the position Lars Petrus named the "Sune") as follows:

 R− B− R+ B− R− B2 R+ B2

In Singmaster's notation, the same move sequence would be written:

 R' D' R D' R' D2 R D2

== Speed cubing ==
The book mentions speed cubing on page 56 – citing the following times:

- 20 minutes - whiz
- 10 minutes - speed demon
- 5 minutes - expert
- 3 minutes - master of cube (M.C.)

As of June 13, 2026, the modern record for speed cubing is 2.76 seconds, set by Teodor Zajder of Poland.

=== Cube games ===
The book ends with a section detailing various patterns one can create with the cube, including Shooting Star, Boxes, spelling the words OHIO and JACK, and a cubic alphabet of 3x3 letters.

== HelpCard ==
The following HelpCard provides a one-page synopsis of the solution detailed in the book.

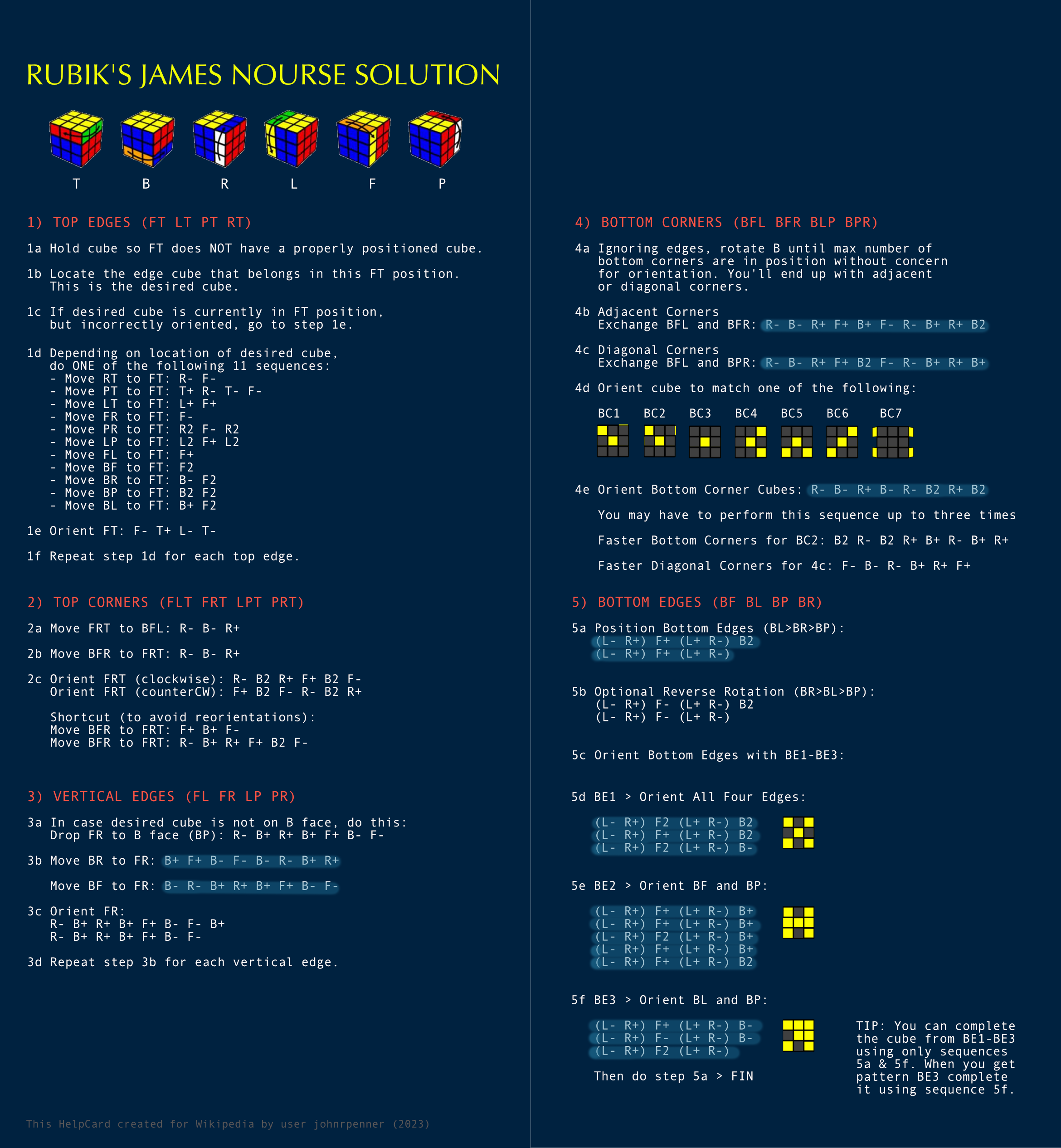
