= LBL =

LBL can mean:

- Laidback Luke, Dutch Music Producer/DJ
- Lawrence Berkeley National Laboratory, formerly Lawrence Berkeley Laboratory
- Liberal Mid-America Regional Airport, IATA code LBL
- Long base line sonar
- Landsforeningen for Bøsser og Lesbiske, former name of LGBT Danmark
- Layer by layer, a thin-film fabrication technique
- Layer by Layer, a Rubik's cube solving technique
- London Borough of Lambeth
- London Borough of Lewisham

== Sports ==
- Latvian Basketball League
- Lech Basket Liga
- Liège–Bastogne–Liège, a one-day classic cycling race in Belgium
