= Rubik's family cubes of varying sizes =

Puzzle

The original Rubik's Cube was a mechanical 3×3×3 cube puzzle invented in 1974 by the Hungarian sculptor and professor of architecture Ernő Rubik. Extensions of the Rubik's Cube have been around for a long time and come in both hardware and software forms. The major extension have been the availability of cubes of larger size and the availability of the more complex cubes with marked centres. The properties of Rubik’s family cubes of any size together with some special attention to software cubes is the main focus of this article. Many properties are mathematical in nature and are functions of the cube size variable.

== Definitions ==
In the main, the terminology used here is in agreement with what is in general use. Elsewhere, some terms are used with different meanings. To avoid misconceptions, the meaning of most terms in use in this article is defined below.

Cube size	The standard Rubik's cube is often referred to as a 3×3×3 cube. That cube will be referred to as a size 3 cube and in general an $n\times n\times n$ cube will be referred to as a size $n$ cube.
Rubik Cube family	Cubes that have similar rotational properties to the standard Rubik's size 3 cube and obey generalized rules for a size $n$ cube are considered to be members of the Rubik Cube family. Cubes of size 2 and above that meet this condition are available.
Cubie	Individual cube elements will be referred to as cubies (others sometimes refer to them as "cubelets"). There are three types of cubies: corner cubies (three coloured surfaces), edge cubies (two coloured surfaces), and centre cubies (one coloured surface). The absolute centre cubies for odd size cubes sit on the central axes of the six faces, and their relative positions never change.
Cubicle	A cubicle is the compartment in which a cubie resides. For a permutation (defined below), cubicles are considered to occupy fixed positions in the space occupied by the cube object, but their contents (cubies) may shift position.
Facelet	A facelet is a visible coloured surface of a cubie (corner cubies have three facelets, edge cubies have two, and centre cubies have one).
Cube style	Two cube styles are referred to herein: firstly a standard cube with unmarked centres and secondly a cube with marked centres.
Cube state	A particular arrangement of the cubies will be referred to as a cube state. What looks the same is considered to be the same (unless specific mention to the contrary is made). Each state has equal probability of being produced after a genuine random scrambling sequence. A rotation of the whole cube does not change the state considered herein. In other texts, the various states are often referred to as permutations or arrangements.
Cube layer	A cube layer is a one-cubie-thick slice of the cube perpendicular to its axis of rotation. Outer layers (faces) contain more cubies than inner layers. For a cube of size $n$, there will be $n$ layers along any given axis.
Cube face	The meaning of a cube face depends on the context in which it is used. It usually means one of the six three-dimensional outer layers but can also refer to just the outside layer's surface which is perpendicular to its axis of rotation. The faces are usually designated as up (U), down (D), front (F), back (B), left (L), and right (R).
Set state	The set (or solved) state of the cube is one for which a uniform colour appears on each of the six faces. For cubes with marked centres, the set state is characterised by a unique arrangement of all centre cubies, and the labelling of those cubies must reflect that.
Scrambled state	The scrambled state is the starting point for unscrambling the cube. It arises when a cube in the set or any other state is subject to a large number of randomly chosen layer rotations.
"Fixed-in-space" axes of rotation	There are three mutually perpendicular axes of rotation for the cube. One set of axes defined in terms of D, U, B, F, L, and R terms can be considered to have a fixed orientation in space. Think of these axes as belonging to a cube-shaped container in which the cube object can be positioned in any of 24 orientations. One axis can be drawn through the centres of the D and U faces (the DU axis). The others are the BF and LR axes.
"Cube object" axes of rotation	Another set of axes can be defined for the cube object itself. These axes relate to the face colours, the most common being white, red, orange, yellow, green, and blue. The axes are usually yellow-white, red-orange, and blue-green. For odd size cubes, these axes are always fixed relative to the internal frame of the cube object. For even size cubes, these axes remain fixed relative to the internal frame of the cube object after initial selections. The origin for the axes is the centre of the cube object.
Layer rotation	The only way that cube state can be changed is by rotations of cube layers about their axes of rotation. All changes of state involve rotation steps that can be considered as a sequence of single layer quarter turns.
Orbit	For a basic quarter turn of a cube layer for cubes of all sizes, sets-of-four cubies move in separate four-cubicle trajectories. When all the possible trajectories for a given cubie type are considered for the whole cube, we will refer to all the possible movement positions as being in a given orbit. We consider that the size 3 cube has two orbits, one in which the eight corner cubies are constrained to move and one in which the 12 edge cubies are constrained to move. Transfer of cubies between these orbits is impossible. For cubes of size 4 and above, we will also define an edge cubie orbit as comprising 12 cubies, but will use the term complementary orbit to describe a pair of orbits between which edge cubies can move. A pair of complementary edge cubie orbits contains a total of 24 cubies. Cubes of size 4 and above include centre cubie orbits that contain 24 cubies. Transfer of cubies between one such orbit and another is not possible (applies to cubes of size 5 and above).
Move	A move is a quarter turn rotation of a layer or a sequence of such quarter turns that a person would apply as a single step.
Move notation	A clockwise quarter turn of an outer layer is usually expressed as U, D, F, B, L, or R. In other respects the notation used varies among authors. For example, a counterclockwise quarter turn of an outer layer could be expressed as U', D', F', B', L', or R'.
Algorithm	An algorithm defines a sequence of layer rotations to transform a given state to another (usually less scrambled) state. Usually an algorithm is expressed as a printable character sequence according to some move notation. An algorithm can be considered to be a "smart" move. All algorithms are moves, but few moves are considered to be algorithms.
Permutation	A permutation of the cube as used herein means the act of permuting (i.e. rearranging) the positions of cubies. A permutation is an all-inclusive term which includes a sequence of quarter turns of any length. Even the solving of the cube from a scrambled state represents a permutation. The term "permutation" is used extensively by mathematicians who use Group Theory to quantify the process involved in a rearrangement of cubies. The term "permutation" is also often used to mean the state of the cube that results after it is rearranged, but that meaning will not be used herein. In such cases, the term "cube state" will be used. That allows the term "permutation" to be used when the permutation results in no change of state - an area of special interest for Rubik’s family cube permutations.
Parity	A cube permutation can be represented by a number of swaps of two cubies. If that number is even, the permutation has even parity, and if the number is odd, the permutation has odd parity.

== Cube types ==
=== Hardware cubes ===
Hardware (physical) cubes are based on the original size 3 cube invented by Ernő Rubik in 1974. These cubes usually use coloured stickers on the facelets for cubie identification. The size 3 standard Rubik’s Cube gained peak interest in the 1980s and was closely followed by the size 4 (Rubik's Revenge) cube. Other, usually more recently available, hardware forms of the cube come in size 2 (Pocket Cube), size 5 (Professor's Cube), size 6 (V-Cube 6), and size 7 (V-Cube 7). Lesser known hardware cubes of larger sizes have also been produced. Currently, the largest hardware cube made is size 49, and the largest mass-produced is size 21.

=== Software cubes ===
In parallel with the hardware form of the cube there are many software forms available that obey the same rules as the hardware forms. Software cube emulators are not subject to the physical restraints that impose a size limit on the hardware forms. Hence the only really big cubes available are those in software form. Also, unlike the hardware forms, a range of cube sizes can easily be accommodated by the one program. The design characteristics of programs that allow users to unscramble cubes vary considerably with such features as the capability to allow the user to save a partially unscrambled state being often available.

Software cubes were in use in the 1980s when monochrome monitors were in common use. The lack of colour meant a different way of face identification was required. A program that retained 1980s monochrome capability (using numerals 1 to 6 to identify facelets) for cubes in the size 2 to 11 range was produced in 1991 (together with colour capability in the size 2 to 15 range). More recently developed software cubes use coloured facelets as for hardware cubes.

The most common, but by no means universal, approach is to emulate the cube by providing a "three-dimensional" display of the cube that makes it look like a real hardware cube. A drawback of the "three-dimensional" display is that, without some extra enhancements, the state of parts of the cube for any given view is hidden.

Other interactive software approaches that do not emulate a three-dimensional cube are also used by some programmers. Generally, an aim of such approaches is to allow the state of all cubies to be in view all the time but has the disadvantage (for some viewers) that the display does not appear like a real-world cube. A conventional two-dimensional (unfolded) display with all cube elements appearing of equal size is one approach. Another form of display where all cube elements do not appear of equal size is also in use. The upper cube size limit for software cubes is limited by the monitor’s available pixels and what viewers find as acceptable which, in turn, is a function of their visual acuity. For cubes of large size it can be advantageous to allow a portion of the cube to be scrolled out of view.

All emulators provide a means for the user to change the cube state step-by-step and unscramble the cube. Most emulators use mouse movements to control the rotation of the cube elements, others use keyboard commands, and some use a combination of both. Some also include the functionality for the computer to automatically find the fastest series of movements to solve the virtual cube and execute them.

Software cubes present some major capabilities that are not possible with hardware cubes. Instant return to the set state is always available. If the program allows a partially unscrambled state to be saved then, by regularly updating the saved state, users need not despair if they do something that leaves their cube in a mess. They can return to their previously recorded state and continue from there. The bigger the cube the more helpful such a capability becomes.

Some Freeware large cube (size greater than 10) implementations are available.

== Cube design variants ==
While there are multiple variants in use only two will be considered here:

- Standard cubes with unmarked centres.
- Cubes with marked centres.

=== Standard cubes with unmarked centres ===
A 2-layer (size 2) cube has corner cubies only.

Cubes of size 2 and size 3 have single solutions, meaning that all the cube elements can have only one correct location for a solved cube.

Centre cubies differ from the corner and edge cubies in that their orientation or position has multiple possibilities. For cubes of odd size, there will be a centre cubie that is centrally located on the cube face and that cubie has only one correct location for a solved cube. However, multiple locations of all other centre cubies apply for a solved cube. The centre cubies (other than the single central one for cubes of odd size) form sets-of-four on each face and sets-of-24 for the whole cube for the various orbits. These centre cubies have four possible final positions (their orientation changes with position but cannot be changed independently) that would satisfy the solved state.

=== Cubes with marked centres ===
Typically, hardware cubes with marked centres use images or logos on the faces to designate what centre cubie(s) orientation is required for a solved cube. Such cubes are also referred to as "supercubes" and the application of markings of this type is generally restricted to just cubes of very small size.

Solving a cube with marked centres is considerably more complex than that for standard cubes. The use of jig-saw style image marking on cubes of large size would make a difficult task even more difficult. Two possibilities in current use on software cubes are the use of a numerical graphic in the "1" to "4" range and the use of a corner marking graphic.

There is a direct correspondence between numerical and corner marking. A top left corner quadrant marking is equivalent to a numerical marking 1, second quadrant to 2, third quadrant to 3, and fourth quadrant to 4. The following image illustrates these different forms of marking.

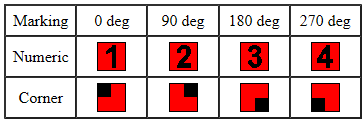

Because transfer of cubies between orbits is impossible, the same 1-2-3-4 markings can be used for each orbit. With the exception of the absolute centre cubies for cubes of odd size, there are 24 centre cubies (4 per face) in each orbit. If $n$ is cube size, there will be $\frac{\left(n-2\right)^2-a}{4}$ orbits where $a$ is zero if $n$ is even or $a$ is one if $n$ is odd.

Numerical marking is typically applicable for cubes up to about size 32. Corner marking while less user-friendly can allow the marked centres range to be extended beyond the numerical marking limit.

Except for absolute centre marking for cubes of odd size, numerical marking would provide the best means of centre cubie marking for hardware cubes as their size range is limited. Rotation of the numbers would mean a small inconvenience relative to non-rotated numbers that can be used for software cubes. The big advantage of numbers is that they reduce the complexity of solving the last cube face when markings are in use (e.g. if the set-of-four sequence is 1-3-4-2 (even parity, needs two swaps to become the required 1-2-3-4) then the algorithm requirement is clear. Algorithms have been defined in and are, of course, equally applicable to hardware cubes.

== Rules for Rubik’s family cubes ==
A cube is solvable if the set state has existed some time in the past and if no tampering of the cube has occurred (e.g. by rearrangement of stickers on hardware cubes or by doing the equivalent on software cubes). Rules for the standard size 3 Rubik's cube and for the complete Rubik's cube family have been documented. Those rules limit what arrangements are possible and mean that, of the possible unrestricted cubie arrangements, the number that are unreachable far outnumber those that are reachable.

Cubes of all sizes have three mutually perpendicular axes about which one or more layers can be rotated. All moves for the cube can be considered as a sequence of quarter-turn rotations about these axes. The movement possibilities give rise to a set of rules (or laws) which in most cases can be expressed in analytical terms.

For a cube of size $n$:

Number of corner cubies	$8$
Number of edge cubies	$12\left(n-2\right)$
Number of centre cubies	$6\left(n-2\right)^2$
Number of facelets	$6n^2$
Total number of cubies	$6\left(n-1\right)^2+2$
Increase in total number of cubies for unit increase in cube size from $n$ to $\left(n+1\right)$	$12n-6$

Every cube move can be considered as a permutation. The relationship between the cube state after a move with that before a move can be expressed mathematically using Group Theory to quantify permutations. Since every move can be considered as a sequence of quarter turn rotations, it is appropriate to examine what is involved in a quarter turn rotation. Except for the absolute centre cubie for odd size cubes, during the quarter turn the cubies move in separate four-cubicle trajectories (also referred to as a 4-cycle movement since four quarter turns will restore the cubies in the specified trajectory to their original positions). A quarter turn of a 4-cubie set can be represented by three swaps as indicated below where swap 1-2 means the contents of cubicle 1 is swapped with the contents of cubicle 2, etc.

Start
1/A	2/B
4/D	3/C

Swap 1-2
B	A
D	C

Swap 1-3
C	A
D	B

Swap 1-4
D	A
C	B

The parity of a permutation refers to whether that permutation is even or odd. An even permutation is one that can be represented by an even number of swaps while an odd permutation is one that can be represented by an odd number of swaps. An odd permutation followed by an odd permutation will represent an overall even permutation (adding two odd numbers always returns an even number). Since a quarter turn is made up of a number of 4-cycles each involving three swaps, if the number of 4-cycles is odd, overall parity of the quarter turn permutation will be odd and vice versa.

Quarter turn permutation parity for a size $n$ cube is given in the following table.

Cube size (odd or even)	Layer type	Number of 4-cycle movements	Overall parity
odd	inner	$n-1$	even
odd	outer	$\frac{\left(n-2\right)^2-1}{4}+\left(n-1\right)$	even (Note: Since $\left(n-2\right)^2-1$ equals $\left(n-1\right)\left(n-3\right)$, a product of two consecutive even numbers, which must always be evenly divisible by 8.)
even	inner	$n-1$	odd
even	outer	$\left(\frac{n}{2}-1\right)^2+\left(n-1\right)$	even if $\frac{n}{2}$ is even (Note: Since $\left(\frac{n}{2}-1\right)^2$ will be odd if $\left(\frac{n}{2}-1\right)$ is odd (i.e. if $\frac{n}{2}$ is even) giving overall even since $(n-1)$ is odd. The reverse applies if $\frac{n}{2}$ is odd.) odd if $\frac{n}{2}$ is odd

Summarising the above parity results we conclude:

- All permutations for odd size cubes have even overall parity.
- All individual quarter turns for even size cubes, where half the cube size is an odd number, have odd overall parity.
- For even size cubes where half the cube size is an even number, inner layer quarter turns have odd overall parity and outer layer quarter turns have even overall parity.

The above analysis considered the parity for corner (where applicable), edge and centre cubies combined. It is possible to consider these in isolation and when that is done an even combined quarter turn parity will involve a number of odd parity elements.

Standard cubes (i.e. cubes with unmarked centres) of any size greater than 3 behave exactly like the size 3 cube if only outer layer rotations are permitted. Parity rules dictate that, for cubes of odd size, the swapping of the two cubies in a single edge set requires a change in the position of centre cubies. It can be shown that, for the size 4 cube the swapping and inverting of the two complementary cubies in a single edge set can be achieved without any change in the position of any other cubies. It can also be shown that, for cubes of even size 6 and above, the swapping of the two cubies in a single edge set requires a change in the position of centre cubies.

A permutation as used here takes account of the change in the positions of cubies, not any change in their orientations. For the 24 edge cubie sets (made up of 12 complementary pairs) there is no restriction on position. Orientation is set by position and cannot be changed independently of position.

Corner cubies behave the same for cubes of all sizes. They have three possible orientations made up from a combination of $\frac{1}{3}$ twists where a full twist (about an axis drawn from the cube corner to the cubie's internal corner) returns the corner cubie to its original orientation. If we designate a unit clockwise twist by $\frac{1}{3}$ and a unit counter-clockwise twist by $-\frac{1}{3}$, then the twist possibilities for a corner cubie relative to any given initial state (the set state for example) are 0, $\frac{1}{3}$ and $-\frac{1}{3}$. The sum of the twist increments across all corner cubies must always be an integer (0, 1 or 2).

When inner layer rotations are included for cubes of size greater than 3, some of the edge cubie movement limitations mentioned above no longer apply. These are expanded on in the Final layer problems section.

Cubie position and orientation are of special concern when unscrambling the final layer. Edge cubies must always end up in exactly the same positions they occupied in the initial set state before scrambling. If any edge cubie in a given edge set in the final layer has a wrong orientation (only applicable to cubes of size greater than 3), it must be in a wrong position and will need to be swapped with a complementary edge cubie also having wrong orientation. With everything else in place, corner cubies can be in the right position but two or more can have incorrect orientation. For standard cubes of size greater than 3, there is a negligible possibility that centre cubies (other than absolute centre cubies for cubes of odd size) will occupy the same positions they had in the initial set state (assuming the centre cubies are unmarked).

Both even and odd size cubes with either marked or unmarked centres obey the rule: "Any permutation that results in only a rearrangement of centre cubies in 24 cubie orbits must have even parity".

If permutations of facelets rather than cubies are considered then both position and orientation of cubies will be taken into account. For software cubes, the states (six colour possibilities) of the $6n^2$ facelets (in a $6\times n\times n$ array for instance) is what would allow complete information on cube state to be saved for later use.

A cube of any size that is subject to repeats of the same permutation will eventually return to the state (e.g. the set state) it occupied before the first application of the permutation. The number of times that a permutation has to be applied to first return the cube to its initial state is referred to as the order or the cycle length of the permutation and is applicable to cubes of all sizes. An overall permutation that results in no change of state is referred to as an Identity Permutation. A program that allows permutation cycle length of any size cube to be determined is available and sample cycle length results have been documented. For a given permutation, cycle length can vary according to:

- Cube size.
- Initial cube state (for standard cubes with unmarked centres).
- Cube style (whether standard or marked centres are in use).
- Spatial orientation (checking all 24 of these rather than just one may give a different result).

The parity of an Identity Permutation is always even. That result for cubes of odd size is obviously true since every quarter turn has even parity. The result is less obvious for cubes of even size. For cubes of even size if the scrambling permutation relative to the previous set state is odd, then any permutation to solve the cube must also have odd parity and vice versa.

The generalized number of possible states for a size $n$ cube is considered in the Reachable states for cubes of all sizes section.

== Cube solving ==
=== Solving by people ===
Cube solving involves starting with a scrambled cube and applying step-by-step layer rotations to eventually end up with a solved cube. For cubes with unmarked centres, that means all faces would need to appear in uniform colour. For cubes with marked centres, a unique arrangement of all centre cubies in addition to the uniform colour requirement would need to apply. Since the starting point is always different, there can never be a unique set of rotations that can be applied to solve a cube. Usually, people work through the solution with the possible use of algorithms, mainly in the latter stage of the unscrambling. In theory, it is possible for a person to write a computer program that "thinks" like a human and solves the cube without human intervention (refer to the Solving by computer program section).

The aim of most software cube emulators is to provide a means for the user to interact with the program to solve (unscramble) the cube in a similar manner to the way they would unscramble a hardware cube.

Efficient rotation sequences (algorithms) can be developed using Group Theory permutation mathematics. However, there are many references to the relevant rotation sequences required to solve cubes of small size (refer to some for size 3, 4, and 5 cubes) and there are multiple approaches to what steps that can be used. There is no such thing as a wrong way to solve a cube. The steps involved in solving any cube of size greater than 4 are fairly straightforward extensions of those required to solve size 3 and size 4 cubes. However, there is limited availability of generalized instructions that can be applied for solving cubes of any size (particularly the large ones). Generalized guidance on one way of solving standard cubes and cubes with marked centres of all sizes is available.

Anybody who can solve a size 4 cube should be able to solve cubes of larger size provided they accept an increased time for solving. Software design features, unavailable in hardware cubes, can simplify the cube solving process. For a given set of cube design features, the complexity (difficulty) of solving a Rubik’s family cube increases if the number of reachable states increases. Three main properties affect that number:

1. Cube size: The number of cubies to be placed is a quadratic (second order polynomial) function of cube size and therefore has a major influence on cube solving complexity.
2. Odd or even size: Even size cubes have an additional effect to just cube size that adds complexity relative to odd size cubes. This effect is relatively small and is independent of cube size (the added contribution when cube size changes from $n$ to $\left(n+1\right)$ for $n$ odd is constant). This effect will be expanded upon when the number of reachable states is considered later.
3. Unmarked or marked centre cubies: Centre cubie marking adds complexity to cube solving.

Additional algorithms to assist users to solve the size 3 and to solve any size cube with marked centres have been defined.

=== Large cube issues ===
Large cube emulators claimed to cater for cubes with any finite number of layers are available. Irrespective of what upper size limit is claimed, available pixels (that vary according to the monitor in use) and the user's visual acuity are going to impose practical limits on the maximum cube size that a person can handle.

As indicated in the Rules for Rubik’s family cubes section, total number of cubies is $\left\{6\left(n-1\right)^2+2\right\}$, and the number of centre cubies is $6\left(n-2\right)^2$, where $n$ is cube size. For large size cubes, the number of centre cubies becomes very dominant as indicated below.

Cube size:	4	8	16	32	64
Total cubies:	56	296	1352	5768	23816
Centre cubie proportion of total cubies (%):	42.8	73.0	87.0	93.6	96.8

It follows that placement of centre cubies will become increasingly more significant than the placement of other cubies as cube size is increased. The time to solve a cube will rise dramatically with cube size. For example, there are about 24 times as many cubies to place in a size 16 cube than there are in a size 4 cube. If the average time to place a cubie were the same in both cases, that factor of 24 in time would also apply. The 24 factor is likely to be an under-estimation, because the presence of a large number of cubies makes it more difficult (and time-consuming) to identify what belongs where.

Providing a software program that allows the state of cubes of big size to be changed is not much more difficult than doing the same thing for cubes of small size. However, solving big cubes is a much more demanding and time-consuming task than doing the same for small cubes. Therefore, it is likely that most really big software cubes that are available have never been solved.

Identifying the exact locations to look for cubies (mainly the quadruple centre cubie sets) is a major issue for big cubes. Use of a secondary marker grid can ease identification. For example, a marker grid to form 4×4 segments for a size 16 cube (16 such segments per face) could be used.

A common set of six cubie colours adopted for both hardware cubes and software cubes comprises white, red, orange, yellow, green, and blue. This colour set may be non-optimum for software cubes of large size where the number of pixels per cubie is small. For instance, the differentiation between white and yellow may be problematic. Reducing the number of colors in the red to blue range from five to four and adding violet (the colour at the extreme of the visible spectrum) produces a colour set that may be considered more suitable for cubes of large size. Some software cube implementations allow users to change the default colour set, if desired. This is a useful addition for users whose colour perception is at variance with the norm.

=== Solving by computer program ===
Cube solving by computer program (as distinct from the normal way people solve a cube) for small size (e.g. size 3) cubes has been developed, and it is equally easy to solve large size cubes by computer.

=== Final layer problems ===
A "final layer problem" is defined here to mean a need for a rearrangement of final layer edge cubies that cannot be achieved using standard size 3 cube moves. These are often referred to as parity problems or errors, but such terminology may be misleading. If moves were limited to those available to the size 3 cube, such states would be unreachable (break parity rules). There are numerous variations in the way the final layer problems are presented and the algorithms to resolve them, but the correction requirement will be similar to that described below. The problems considered here apply equally to standard cubes and to those with marked centres but in the latter case additional final layer issues arise for aligning centre cubies. The problems for larger cubes can be considered as straightforward extensions of those that apply to the size 4 cube. Basically, two types of problem can arise:

- There is a need to flip a complementary pair or a complete set of edge cubies in the final edge set. This condition will be referred to as an OLL (orientation of last layer) requirement.
- There is a need to swap the positions of two edge cubie sets in the final layer. This condition will be referred to as a PLL (permutation of last layer) requirement.

OLL and PLL as used here can be considered to be sub-sets of the usual definitions of these terms. There are many references to moves that can be used to resolve these problems. Fewer references demonstrate how these moves satisfy parity rules. From a parity perspective, there is a need to consider the rearrangement of centre cubies which is not readily observable in cubes with unmarked centres. Only OLL parity compliance will be illustrated here.

A typical OLL correction for a size 9 cube is shown. The cubies shown in colour are the only ones in the cube that change positions.

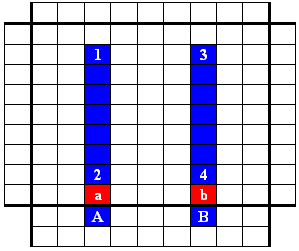
OLL before correction for size 9 cube

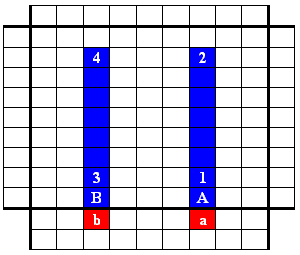
OLL after correction for size 9 cube

For the OLL correction there are $n-2$ centre cubie swaps and overall there are $\left(n-1\right)$ swaps when the edge pair is included. For odd size cubes $\left(n-1\right)$ is always even (and conforms with the universal even parity requirement for odd size cubes). For even size cubes $\left(n-1\right)$ is always odd which means in this case a parity reversal always occurs, an allowable parity condition for even size cubes.

For the complete edge set flip (a requirement that can arise only for cubes of even size), the number of swaps will be $\left(n-1\right)\left(\frac{n}{2}-1\right)$. The overall number of swaps will be even if $\left(\frac{n}{2}-1\right)$ is even (i.e. $\frac{n}{2}$ is odd). The overall number of swaps will be odd if $\frac{n}{2}$ is even. Hence overall parity will be even if $\frac{n}{2}$ is odd and odd if $\frac{n}{2}$ is even.

The parity of a given algorithm can, of course, also be deduced from its content using the rules detailed in the Rules for Rubik’s family cubes section.

For standard cubes the rearrangement of centre cubies to resolve the OLL and PLL problems is unimportant. For cubes with marked centre cubies the effect of this rearrangement of these cubies is a serious drawback. For cubes with marked centres it is not possible (except for the size 4 cube) to align all final layer centre cubies until all edge cubies have been placed in their final positions.

=== Algorithms ===
Instructions for people on how to solve Rubik's type cubes are normally conveyed either in purely graphical form or as sequences defined using a printable character notation. A character sequence that can be translated and applied to perform a sequence of layer rotations to transform a given state to another (usually less scrambled) state is often referred to as an algorithm. Algorithms are most commonly used when unscrambling the latter portion of the cube but can be applied more extensively if desired. Algorithms can be written down as instructions that can be memorized or looked up in a document. The printable characters used (e.g. to indicate an anticlockwise quarter turn, a single layer quarter turn, or a multiple layer quarter turn) in algorithm instructions vary among authors, as does their positions in the instructions. Where people interpret instructions the way they are presented is insignificant. The only time the form of presentation has significance is when computer keyboard entry is used to change the state of software cubes, and automatic updating of the screen image occurs whenever a valid instruction is received. For example, if F′ is used to represent an anticlockwise quarter turn of the front face, then, as the user types in F, a clockwise quarter turn will occur, and a correction will be needed when the user types the ′ character. The end result will still be correct, but use of −F rather than F′ would eliminate the superfluous rotation. Any text enhancements, such as superscripts or subscripts, must be avoided in the method of presenting cube rotation sequences when users communicate with software cubes via keyboard commands. When computer keyboard entry of instructions is used, macros (which map a short input text string to a longer string) can be used as algorithm shortcuts.

=== Time to solve cubes ===
Speedcubing (or speedsolving) is the practice of solving a cube in the Rubik's cube family in the shortest time possible (which usually implies reducing the number of quarter turn moves required). It is most commonly applied to cubes of smaller size, and there are numerous solving methods that have been documented. An international team of researchers using computer power from Google has found every way the standard size 3 Rubik's cube can be solved and have shown that it is possible to complete the solution in 20 moves or fewer for any initial scrambled state (where a move here is defined as a quarter or a half turn of a face). Generally, speed solving methods apply more to specialist cubists than typical cubists and are more complex than simple layer-by-layer type methods.

== Reachable and unreachable states for cubes of all sizes ==
If a cube has at some previous time occupied the set state, then any state that can arise after legal moves is considered to be a reachable state. For small size cubes (size 2, 3, or 4), an unreachable state is one that cannot be reached by legal moves. For larger cubes, there needs to be some further qualification on what is meant by an unreachable state. In this article, notional movement between 24-cubie orbits for edge and for centre cubies is excluded.

=== Relationship between reachable and unreachable states ===
If, for a cube of any size, m represents the number of reachable states, u represents the number of unreachable states, and t equals their sum:

$$t=u+m$$
$t=km$ where $k$ is a positive integer
$$u=\left(k-1\right)m$$

Both m and k are functions of cube size $n$. Values for m and k will be considered in the following sections. In other texts, "reachable states" are often referred to as "permutations".

=== Reachable states for cubes of all sizes ===
The number of reachable states is based on:

- Standard permutations and combinations mathematics.
- Reduction factors that must be applied to above to reflect movement restrictions specific to Rubik’s family cubes.

The number of different states that are reachable for cubes of any size can be simply related to the numbers that are applicable to the size 3 and size 4 cubes. Hofstadter in his 1981 paper provided a full derivation of the number of states for the standard size 3 Rubik's cube. More recent information sources that adequately justify the figures for the size 3 and size 4 cubes are also available. References that indicate the number of possible states for a size $n$ cube are available. The brief material provided below presents the results in the form used in one of these references which covers the topic in far more detail.

For cubes with unmarked centre cubies the following positive integer constants (represented by P, Q, R, and S) apply. These constants are in agreement with figures frequently quoted for the size 3 and size 4 cubes.

Corner cubie possibilities for even size cubes	P	(7!) 3^{6}	3,674,160
Central edge cubie possibilities for odd size cubes, multiplied by 24	Q	24 (12!) 2^{10}	1.17719433216000 × 10^{13}
Edge cubie possibilities for each dual set (12 pairs)	R	24!	6.20448401733239 × 10^{23}
Centre cubie possibilities for each quadruple set (6 groups of 4)	S	(24!)/(4!)^{6}	3.24667053711000 × 10^{15}
Note: ! is the factorial symbol (N! means the product 1 × 2 × ... × N).

The value of S may warrant a word of explanation as it is commonly inferred that the number of possible states for centre cubies with identifying markings for a size 4 cube is 24!. Use of that value is guaranteed to yield the wrong answer if cubes with marked centres are under consideration. The first 20 cubies can be arbitrarily placed giving rise to factor 24!/4!. However, for each possible arrangement of edge cubies, only half the 4! hypothetical arrangements for the last four are reachable. Hence the correct value for the cube with marked centres is 24!/2. If the markings are removed, then a "permutation with some objects identical" applies. For the standard cube the marked cube value needs to be divided by (4!)^{6}/2 (the 2 divisor must also be applied here). That gives an overall S value for the size 4 cube of 24!/(4!)^{6}. All states for 24-centre-cubie orbits for standard Rubik’s family cubes are reachable (if required, even parity is always achievable by swapping the positions of a couple of centre cubies of the same colour).

$m = \textrm{P}\textrm{Q}^a\textrm{R}^b\textrm{S}^c$

where $a$, $b$, and $c$ are positive integer variables (functions of cube size $n$) as given below.
$a = n \textrm{ mod }2$ (i.e. 0 if $n$ is even or 1 if $n$ is odd)
$$b = \frac{n-2-a}{2}$$
$$c = \frac{\left(n-2\right)^2-a}{4}$$

For even size cubes $\textrm{Q}^a = 1$ (see exponentiation).

For further simplification, parameter $m$ may also be expressed as $m = 10^y$ where $y=\textrm{log}_{10}m$. Parameter $y$ can be related to $n$ by a continuous quadratic function subject to the restriction that $n$ must be an integer greater than 1 when referring to possible states for cubes:

$$y = \textrm{A}n^2+\textrm{B}n+\textrm{C}$$

where A, B, and C are constants. Constants A and B are the same for $n$ even and for $n$ odd, but the value of C is different.

Parameter	Value
A	3.87785955497335
B	-3.61508538481188
C_{EVEN}	-1.71610938550614
C_{ODD}	-4.41947361312695
C_{EVEN} - C_{ODD}	2.70336422762081

In graphical terms, when $y$ is plotted, two parabolae of exactly the same shape are involved, with "even" cube values lying on one and "odd" cube values lying on the other. The difference is imperceptible except when plotted over a small range of $n$, as indicated in the graphs reproduced below. Only Rubik’s family values for $n$ equal to 2 and 3 are included in the second graph.

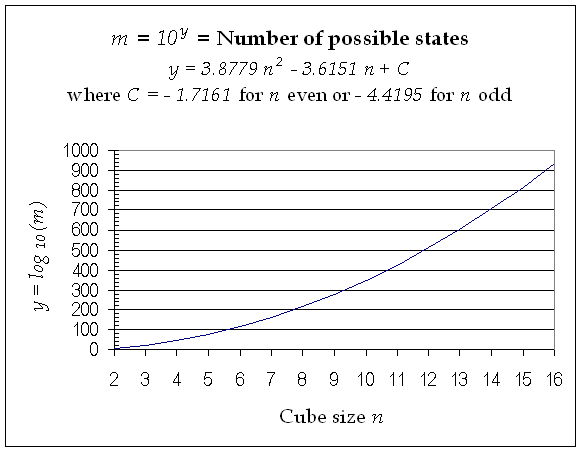

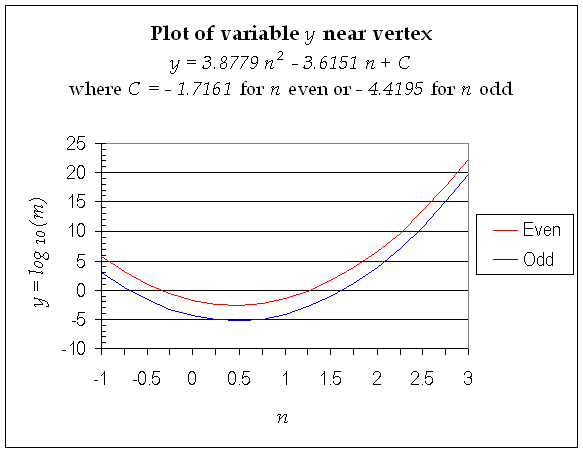

Use of the log function y provides the only practical means of plotting numbers that vary over such a huge range as that for the Rubik's cube family. The difference between the curves translates as a factor of 505.08471690483 (equal to $\frac{\textrm{R}^{0.5}\textrm{S}^{0.25}}{\textrm{Q}}$). This is the factor that defines the effect of even size, relative to odd size, on the number of reachable states for cubes with unmarked centres.

Hence, with the logarithmic presentation the number of cube states can be expressed using just four numbers (A, B, and the two C values). Furthermore, the number of cube states form a restricted set of values for a more general continuous quadratic (parabolic) function for which $n$ can have non-integer and negative values. Calculating the value of m from the corresponding value of y is a straightforward process.

Centre cubies are different from corner or edge cubies in that, unless they have indicative markings, there are multiple possibilities for their final orientation and/or locations. The number of different ways centre cubies can be arranged to yield a solved cube with unmarked centre cubies may be of interest. To calculate that, the impact of centre cubie marking needs to be assessed. Define $m_\textrm{M}$, $\textrm{Q}_\textrm{M}$, and $\textrm{S}_\textrm{M}$ to be the changed parameters for marked centre cubies (P and R remain unchanged).

$\textrm{Q}_\textrm{M} = \textrm{T Q}$ where $\textrm{T} = \frac{4^6}{2} = 2048$
$\textrm{S}_\textrm{M} = \textrm{V S}$ where $\textrm{V} = \frac{(4!)^6}{2} = 95551488$
$$m_\textrm{M} = \textrm{P}\left(\textrm{Q}_\textrm{M}\right)^a\textrm{R}^b\left(\textrm{S}_\textrm{M}\right)^c$$
$$m_\textrm{M} = m_\textrm{D}m$$
$$m_\textrm{M} = \textrm{T}^a\textrm{V}^c$$

Parameter $m_\textrm{M}$ defines the number of reachable states for cubes with marked centres. Factor $m_\textrm{D}$ gives the number of different arrangements of unmarked centre cubies that will provide a solved size $n$ cube. It is also the factor by which the number of different states for a standard cube needs to be multiplied by when marked centres apply.

=== Unreachable states for cubes of all sizes ===
The number of unreachable states far exceeds the number of reachable states. There are many references to the number of unreachable states for the size 3 cube but very few for larger size cubes.

The unreachable arrangements for corner and edge cubies are the same for cubes with or without marked centres.

If a corner cubie for cubes of any size is considered, then a 1/3 twist clockwise leaving everything else unchanged will represent an unreachable state, and similarly for a 1/3 twist counter-clockwise. Hence only 1/3 of the twist possibilities are reachable.

For the central edge cubie for odd size cubes the behaviour is the same as that for the size 3 cube. Only half the conceivable positions are reachable and only half the conceivable orientations are reachable. Hence only 1/4 of the central edge cubie movement possibilities are reachable.

Edge cubies that comprise 12 complementary pairs (24 cubies total) behave as if the complementary cubies did not look the same. Any given edge cubie can move to any position in the 24-cubie orbit but for any given position there is one reachable and one unreachable orientation for that cubie. The reverse applies for the complementary edge cubie. For a given cubie (1-2) the reachable and unreachable orientations for a given face for a given orbit for a size 8 cube is illustrated below. One of the 24 reachable possibilities for a given edge cubie matches that of the set cube.

The number of unreachable states for a 24-edge-cubie set is the same as the number of reachable states (24! in each case).

In the case of the marked centre cubies only half the conceivable arrangements for each set of 24 cubies for any given orbit are reachable. The same parity rules that apply for marked centre cubies also apply for the unmarked centre cubies. A quarter turn of a set-of-four centre cubies cannot be achieved without changing the arrangement elsewhere to meet the parity requirement. Because there are 95551488 ways of arranging the individual centre cubies so that the resulting arrangement appears exactly the same, parity rules can be met without any observable indication of how the parity compliance is achieved. Hence, for the normal case (24 cubies comprising four of each of six colours) there is no restriction on the achievable states for the centre cubies.

The following table uses the values noted above to represent the k component factors for the size $n$ cube. Exponents a, b and c are functions of cube size $n$ as defined above.

Reduction components for factor k (for standard cube with unmarked centres) and for $k_\textrm{M}$ (for cube with marked centres)	Unmarked centres' cube type	Marked centres' cube type
Corner cubie factor	3	3
Central edge cubie factor (such cubies exist only for cubes of odd size)	$2^{2a}$	$2^{2a}$
Complementary edge cubie factor for all 12-pair sets combined	$2^b$	$2^b$
Absolute centre cubie factor (such cubies exist only for cubes of odd size)	1	$2^a$
Centre cubie factor for all 24-cubie sets combined	1	$2^c$

Taking the product of these factors:

For the standard size $n$ cube	$k=\left(3\right)2^{2a+b}$
For the marked centres' size $n$ cube	$k_\textrm{M}=\left(3\right)2^{3a+b+c}$

Some values for cubes of small size are given below.

Cube size	2	3	4	5	6	7	8
Value of $k$	3	12	6	24	12	48	24
Value of $k_\textrm{M}$	3	24	12	192	192	6144	12288

The number of unreachable states is given by $(k-1)m$ for standard cubes and by $(k_\textrm{M}-1)m_\textrm{M}$ for cubes with marked centre cubies.
