= Rubik's Cube =

3D combination puzzle

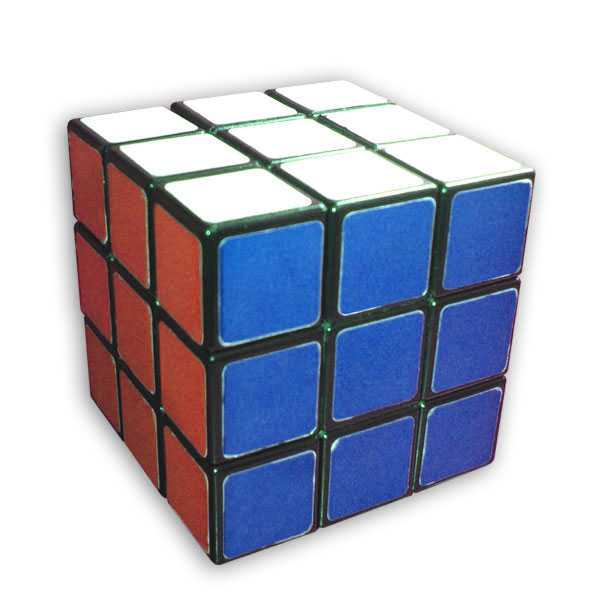
- Other names: Magic Cube, Cube
- Type: Combination puzzle
- Invented by: Ernő Rubik
- Company: Rubik's Brand Ltd (Spin Master)
- Country: Hungary
- Availability: 1977: as Hungarian Magic Cube, first test batches released in Budapest; As Rubik's Cube, worldwide, 1980–present
- Official website

An illustration of an unsolved Rubik's Cube

The Rubik's Cube (Hungarian: Rubik-kocka) is a 3D combination puzzle invented in 1974 by Hungarian sculptor and professor of architecture Ernő Rubik. Originally called the Magic Cube (Hungarian: bűvös kocka), the puzzle was licensed by Rubik to be sold by Pentangle Puzzles in the United Kingdom in 1978, and then by Ideal Toy Corp in 1980 via businessman Tibor Laczi and Seven Towns founder Tom Kremer. The cube was released internationally in 1980 and became one of the most recognised icons in popular culture. It won the 1980 German Game of the Year special award for Best Puzzle. As of January 2024, around 500 million cubes had been sold worldwide, making it the world's bestselling puzzle game and bestselling toy. The Rubik's Cube was inducted into the US National Toy Hall of Fame in 2014.

On the original, classic Rubik's Cube, each of the six faces was covered by nine stickers, with each face in one of six solid colours: white, red, blue, orange, green and yellow. Some later versions of the cube have been updated to use coloured plastic panels instead. Since 1988, the arrangement of colours has been standardised, with white opposite yellow, blue opposite green and orange opposite red, and with the red, white and blue arranged clockwise, in that order. On early cubes, the position of the colours varied from cube to cube.

A salaryman trying to solve a Rubik's Cube in an izakaya after work in Japan, 2008

An internal pivot mechanism enables each layer to turn independently, thus mixing up the colours. For the puzzle to be solved, each face must be returned to having only one colour. The cube has inspired other designers to create a number of similar puzzles with various numbers of sides, dimensions and mechanisms.

Although the Rubik's Cube reached the height of its mainstream popularity in the 1980s, it is still widely known and used. Many speedcubers continue to practise it and similar puzzles, competing for the fastest times in various categories. Since 2003, the World Cube Association (WCA), the international governing body of the Rubik's Cube, has organised competitions worldwide and has recognised world records.

== History ==
=== Precursors ===
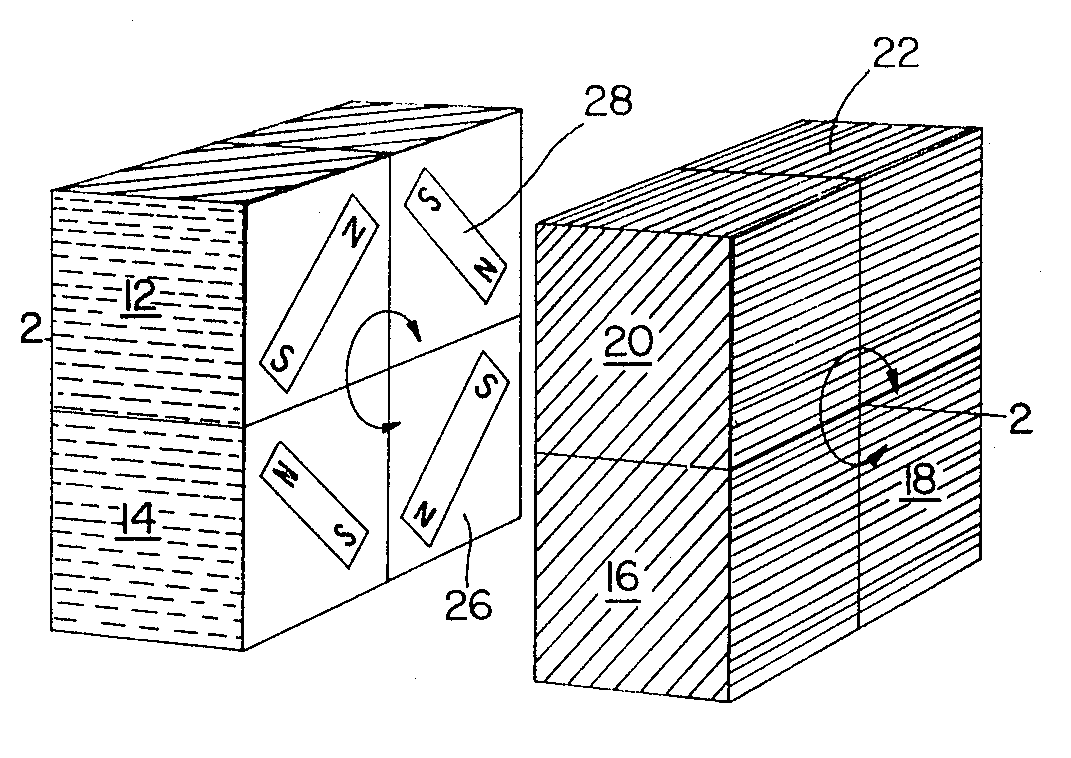
Diagram from Nichols' patent showing a cube held together with magnets

In March 1970, Larry D. Nichols invented a 2×2×2 "Puzzle with Pieces Rotatable in Groups" and filed a Canadian patent application for it. Nichols's cube was held together by magnets. Nichols was granted U.S. patent 3,655,201 on 11 April 1972, two years before Rubik invented his Cube.

On 9 April 1970, Frank Fox applied to patent an "amusement device", a type of sliding puzzle on a spherical surface with "at least two 3×3 arrays" intended to be used for the game of noughts and crosses. He received his UK patent (1344259) on 16 January 1974.

=== Rubik's invention ===
In the mid-1970s, Ernő Rubik worked at the Department of Interior Design at the Academy of Applied Arts and Crafts in Budapest, where he taught courses on design and architecture and experimented with three-dimensional structures and models. Although it is widely reported that the Cube was initially built as a teaching tool to help his students understand 3D objects and spatial relationships, his actual purpose was solving the structural problem of allowing many small parts to move independently while still remaining part of a single, coherent mechanical system. In other words, Rubik was primarily interested in engineering a stable, twistable structure in which each layer could rotate freely without the entire mechanism falling apart. He did not immediately realise that he had created a puzzle: this only became apparent after he scrambled his newly constructed Cube for the first time and then attempted to restore it to its original ordered state. According to later recollections, it took him about a month of trial and error to solve his own creation, during which time he became aware of the Cube's combinatorial complexity and potential as a recreational object. Rubik applied for a patent in Hungary for his "Magic Cube" (Hungarian: bűvös kocka) on 30 January 1975. The patent HU170062, granted later that year, covered the core mechanical idea of a three-dimensional combination puzzle based on interlocking elements rotating around a central axis. This protection allowed Rubik and his collaborators to explore ways of manufacturing the object on a larger scale within the Hungarian toy industry. Decades later, Rubik described his early experiments, the intellectual background of the invention, and his reflections on the Cube’s cultural impact in his book Cubed: The Puzzle of Us All.

The first test batches of the Magic Cube were produced in late 1977 and released in toy shops in Budapest, where they attracted local attention among students, hobbyists, and puzzle enthusiasts. The Magic Cube was held together with interlocking plastic pieces that prevented the puzzle from being easily pulled apart, in contrast to the earlier design by Larry Nichols, whose cube used small internal magnets and was less robust under repeated twisting. Rubik’s design emphasised durability and smooth rotation, making it better suited to mass play and repeated handling.

With Ernő Rubik's permission, businessman Tibor Laczi took a Cube to Germany's Nuremberg Toy Fair in February 1979 in an attempt to popularise it outside Hungary. At the fair it was noticed by Seven Towns founder Tom Kremer, a toy inventor and marketer who immediately recognised its commercial potential. After negotiations, Seven Towns and Rubik’s Hungarian partners signed a deal with Ideal Toys in September 1979 to release the Magic Cube worldwide. Ideal wanted a distinctive and easily recognisable name to trademark; that arrangement put Rubik himself in the spotlight because the Magic Cube was renamed after its inventor in 1980.

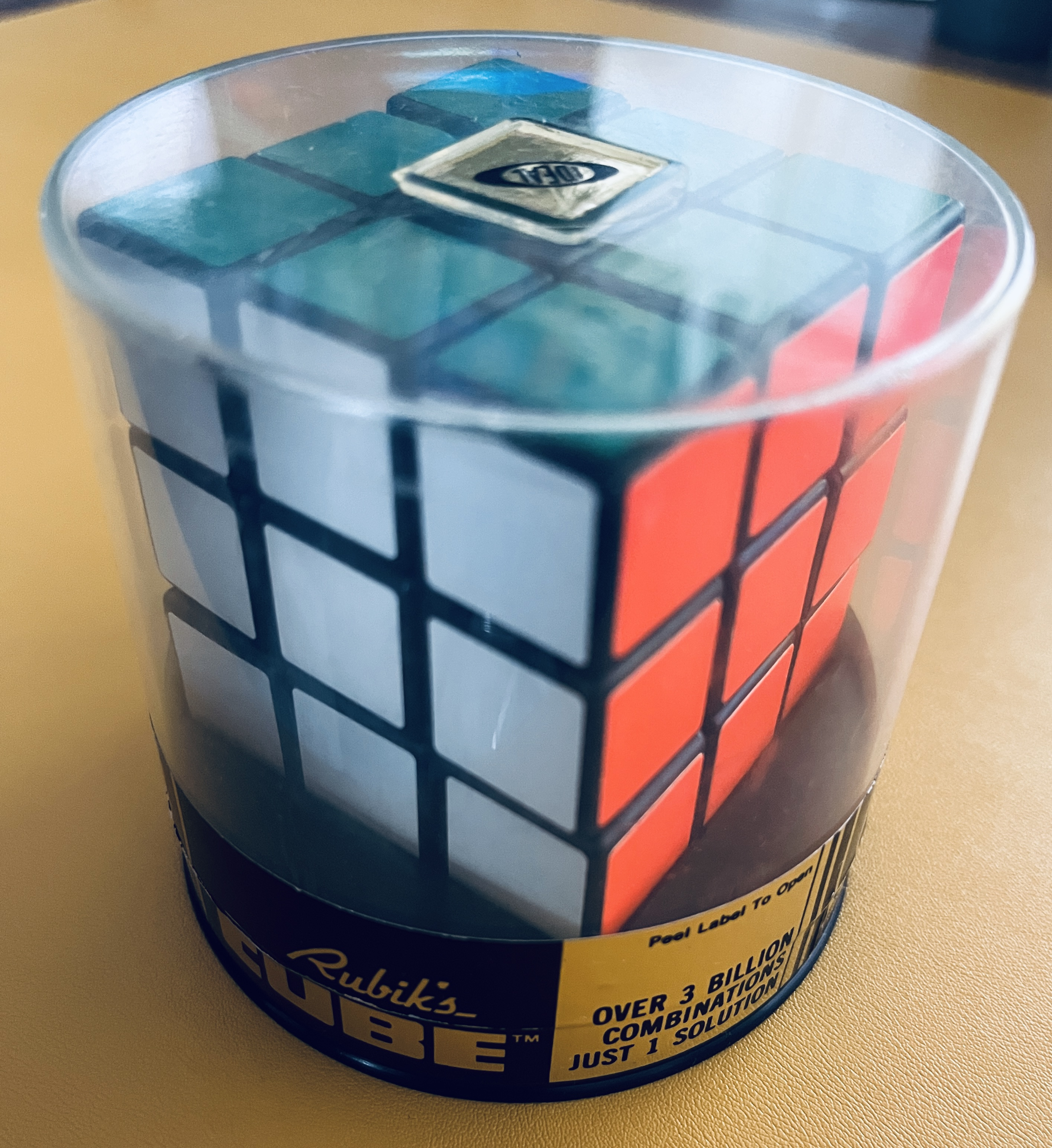
Original Rubik's Cube – Ideal Toy Corp., made in Hungary 1980

The puzzle made its international debut at the toy fairs of London, Paris, Nuremberg, and New York in January and February 1980, where it was presented as a challenging but accessible brainteaser for all ages. Demonstrations at these fairs, along with early media coverage, helped to establish the Cube as a visually striking and intellectually demanding novelty, setting the stage for its rapid global spread.

After its international debut, the progress of the Cube towards the toy shop shelves of the West was briefly halted so that it could be manufactured to Western safety and packaging specifications, including changes to labelling, materials, and small-parts standards. A lighter Cube was produced to reduce manufacturing costs and to meet these safety requirements, and Ideal decided to rename it. "The Gordian Knot" and "Inca Gold" were among the names considered, but the company ultimately decided on "Rubik's Cube", explicitly associating the product with its inventor and reinforcing its identity as a modern, mechanical puzzle. The first batch of officially branded Rubik's Cubes was exported from Hungary in May 1980, initially to Western European markets and then to North America and beyond.

The packaging had a few variations depending on the country, the most popular being a clear plastic cylinder that displayed the Cube in its solved state as a colourful object suspended in the centre. Cardboard box versions were also used, often including instruction leaflets or promotional booklets. The cube itself exhibited slight regional variations, particularly in the order and arrangement of the colours (for example, a Western versus Japanese colour scheme in which blue and yellow are switched), and some early production runs did not feature a white centre piece logo. These small differences have since become a point of interest for collectors and historians of the puzzle.

=== 1980s Cube craze ===
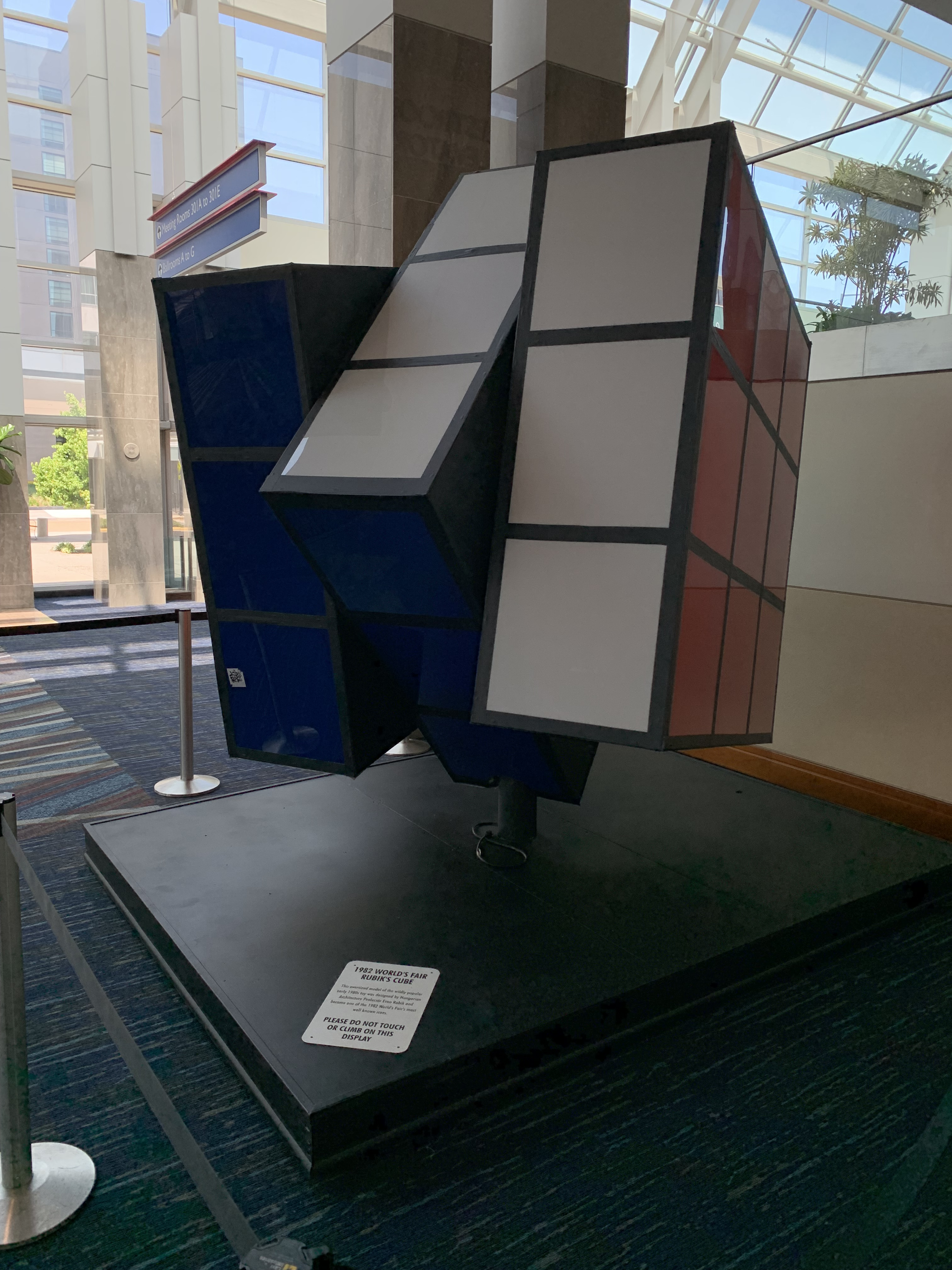
The world's largest Rubik's Cube was constructed for the 1982 World's Fair in Knoxville, Tennessee.

After the first batches of Rubik's Cubes were released in May 1980, initial sales were modest, but Ideal began a television advertising campaign in the middle of the year which it supplemented with newspaper advertisements. At the end of 1980, Rubik's Cube won a German Game of the Year special award and won similar awards for best toy in the UK, France, and the US. By 1981, Rubik's Cube had become a craze, and it is estimated that in the period from 1980 to 1983 around 200 million Rubik's Cubes were sold worldwide. In March 1981, a speedcubing championship organised by the Guinness Book of World Records was held in Munich, and a Rubik's Cube was depicted on the front cover of Scientific American that same month. In June 1981, The Washington Post reported that Rubik's Cube is "a puzzle that's moving like fast food right now ... this year's Hoola Hoop or Bongo Board", and by September 1981, New Scientist noted that the cube had "captivated the attention of children of ages from 7 to 70 all over the world this summer."

As most people could solve only one or two sides, numerous books were published including David Singmaster's Notes on Rubik's "Magic Cube" (1980) and Patrick Bossert's You Can Do the Cube (1981). At one stage in 1981, three of the top ten best selling books in the US were books on solving Rubik's Cube, and the best-selling book of 1981 was James G. Nourse's The Simple Solution to Rubik's Cube which sold over 6 million copies. In 1981, the Museum of Modern Art in New York exhibited a Rubik's Cube, and at the 1982 World's Fair in Knoxville, Tennessee a six-foot Cube was put on display. In 1983, ABC Television released a cartoon show called Rubik, the Amazing Cube. In June 1982, the First Rubik's Cube World Championship took place in Budapest and would become the only competition recognized as official until the championship was revived in 2003.

In October 1982, The New York Times reported that sales had fallen and that "the craze has died", and by 1983 it was clear that sales had plummeted. However, in some countries such as China and the USSR, the craze had started later and demand was still high because of a shortage of Cubes.

=== 21st-century revival ===
Rubik's Cubes continued to be marketed and sold throughout the 1980s and 1990s, but it was not until the early 2000s that interest in the Cube began increasing again. In the US, sales doubled between 2001 and 2003, and The Boston Globe remarked that it was "becoming cool to own a Cube again". The 2003 Rubik's Cube World Championship was the first speedcubing tournament since 1982. It was held in Toronto and was attended by 83 participants. The tournament led to the formation of the World Cube Association in 2004. Annual sales of Rubik branded cubes were said to have reached 15 million worldwide in 2008. Part of the new appeal was ascribed to the advent of Internet video sites, such as YouTube, which allowed fans to share their solving strategies. Following the expiration of Rubik's patent in 2000, other brands of cubes appeared, especially from Chinese companies. Many of these Chinese branded cubes have been engineered for speed and are favoured by speedcubers. On 27 October 2020, Spin Master said it will pay $50 million to buy the Rubik's Cube brand.

== Imitations ==
Taking advantage of an initial shortage of cubes, many imitations and variations appeared, many of which may have violated one or more patents. In 2000, the patents expired, and since then, many Chinese companies have produced copies, modifications, and improvements upon the Rubik and V-Cube designs.

=== Patent history ===
Nichols assigned his patent to his employer Moleculon Research Corp., which sued Ideal in 1982. In 1984, Ideal lost the patent infringement suit and appealed. In 1986, the appeals court affirmed the judgment that Rubik's 2×2×2 Pocket Cube infringed Nichols's patent, but overturned the judgment on Rubik's 3×3×3 Cube.

Even while Rubik's patent application was being processed, Terutoshi Ishigi, a self-taught engineer and ironworks owner near Tokyo, filed for a Japanese patent for a nearly identical mechanism, which was granted in 1976 (Japanese patent publication JP55-008192). Until 1999, when an amended Japanese patent law was enforced, Japan's patent office granted Japanese patents for non-disclosed technology within Japan without requiring worldwide novelty. Hence, Ishigi's patent is generally accepted as an independent reinvention at that time. Rubik applied for more patents in 1980, including another Hungarian patent on 28 October. In the United States, Rubik was granted U.S. patent 4,378,116 on 29 March 1983 for the Cube. This patent expired in 2000.

=== Trademarks ===
Rubik's Brand Ltd. also holds the registered trademarks for the word "Rubik" and "Rubik's" and for the 2D and 3D visualisations of the puzzle. The trademarks were upheld by a ruling of the General Court of the European Union on 25 November 2014 in a successful defense against a German toy manufacturer seeking to invalidate them. However, European toy manufacturers are allowed to create differently shaped puzzles that have a similar rotating or twisting functionality of component parts, such as Skewb, Pyraminx or Impossiball.

On 10 November 2016, Rubik's Cube lost a ten-year battle over a key trademark issue. The European Union's highest court, the Court of Justice, ruled that the puzzle's shape was not sufficient to grant it trademark protection.

== Mechanics ==
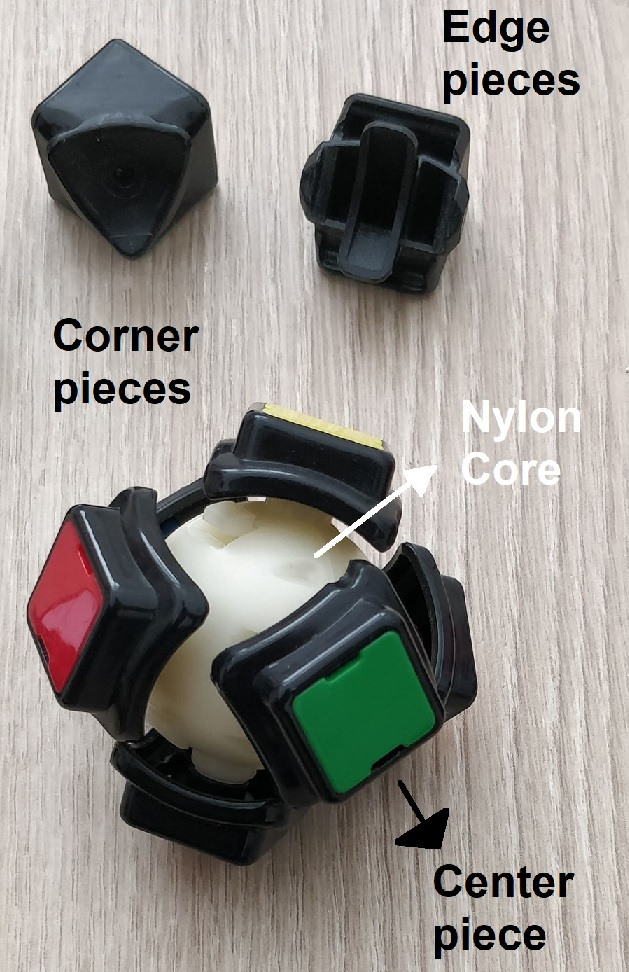
Rubik's cube components with label

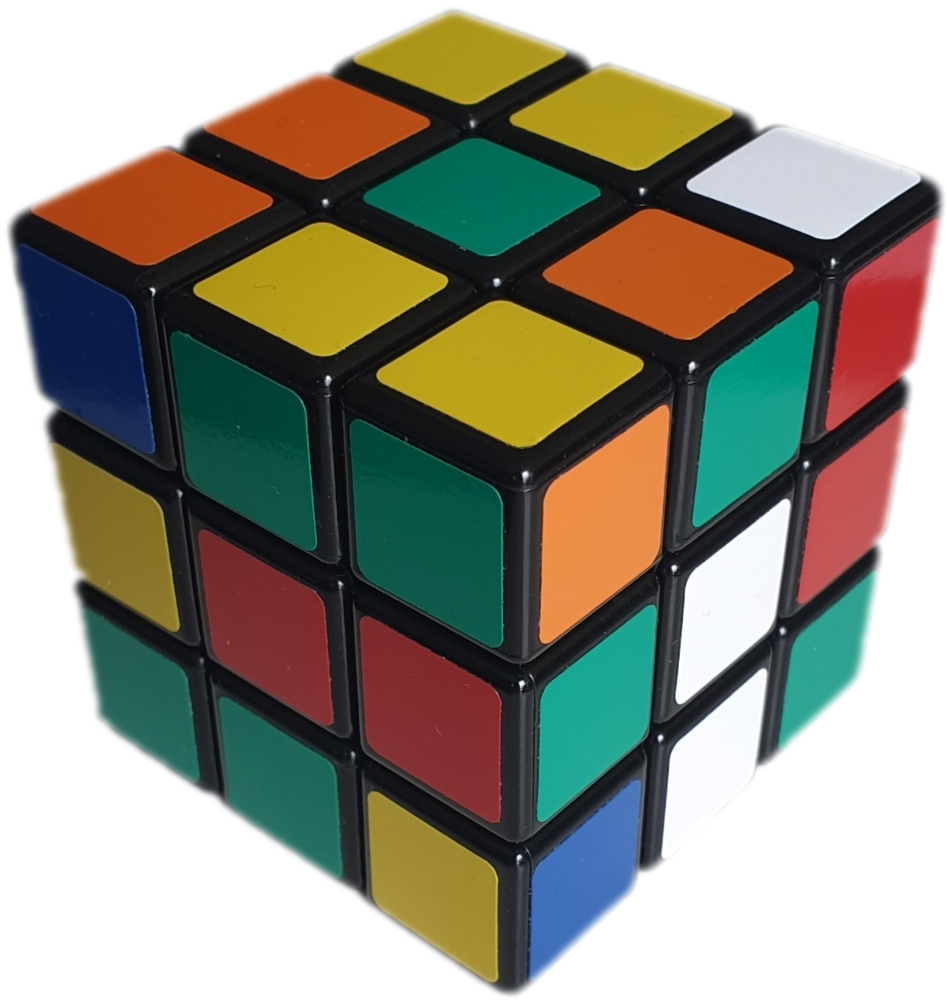
Rubik's Cube in scrambled state

A standard Rubik's Cube measures 5.6 centimetres (2 1/4 in) on each side. The puzzle consists of 26 unique miniature cubes, also known as "cubies" or "cubelets". Each of these includes a concealed inward extension that interlocks with the other cubes while permitting them to move to different locations. However, the centre cube of each of the six faces is merely a single square façade; all six are affixed to the core mechanism. These provide structure for the other pieces to fit into and rotate around. Hence, there are 21 pieces: a single core piece consisting of three intersecting axes holding the six centre squares in place but letting them rotate, and 20 smaller plastic pieces that fit into it to form the assembled puzzle.

Each of the six centre pieces pivots on a fastener held by the centre piece, a "3D cross". A spring between each fastener and its corresponding piece tensions the piece inward, so that collectively, the whole assembly remains compact but can still be easily manipulated. The older versions of the official Cube used a screw that can be tightened or loosened to change the "feel" of the Cube. Newer official Rubik's brand cubes have rivets instead of screws and cannot be adjusted. Inexpensive clones do not have screws or springs; all they have is a plastic clip to keep the centre piece in place and freely rotate.

The Cube can be taken apart without much difficulty, typically by rotating the top layer by 45° and then prying one of its edge cubes away from the other two layers. Consequently, it is a simple process to "solve" a Cube by taking it apart and reassembling it in a solved state.

There are six central pieces that show one coloured face, twelve edge pieces that show two coloured faces, and eight corner pieces that show three coloured faces. Each piece shows a unique colour combination, but not all combinations are present (for example, if red and orange are on opposite sides of the solved Cube, there is no edge piece with both red and orange sides). The location of these cubes relative to one another can be altered by twisting an outer third of the Cube by increments of 90 degrees, but the location of the coloured sides relative to one another in the completed state of the puzzle cannot be altered; it is fixed by the relative positions of the centre squares. However, Cubes with alternative colour arrangements also exist; for example, with the yellow face opposite the green, the blue face opposite the white, and red and orange remaining opposite each other.

Douglas Hofstadter, in the July 1982 issue of Scientific American, pointed out that Cubes could be coloured in such a way as to emphasise the corners or edges, rather than the faces as the standard colouring does; but neither of these alternative colourings has ever become popular.

== Mathematics ==
The puzzle was originally advertised as having "over 3,000,000,000 (three billion) combinations but only one solution". Depending on how combinations are counted, the actual number is significantly higher.

=== Permutations ===
The current colour scheme of a Rubik's Cube – yellow opposes white, blue opposes green, orange opposes red, and white, green, and red are positioned in anti-clockwise order around a corner.

The original (3×3×3) Rubik's Cube has eight corners and twelve edges. There are 8! (40,320) ways to arrange the corner cubes. Each corner has three possible orientations, although only seven (of eight) can be oriented independently; the orientation of the eighth (final) corner depends on the preceding seven, giving 3^{7} (2,187) possibilities. There are 12!/2 (239,500,800) ways to arrange the edges, restricted from 12! because edges must be in an even permutation exactly when the corners are. (When arrangements of centres are also permitted, as described below, the rule is that the combined arrangement of corners, edges, and centres must be an even permutation.) Eleven edges can be flipped independently, with the flip of the twelfth depending on the preceding ones, giving 2^{11} (2,048) possibilities. Thus the total number of arrangements of a Rubik's Cube is
$${8! \times 3^7 \times \frac{12!}{2} \times 2^{11}} = 43{,}252{,}003{,}274{,}489{,}856{,}000$$
or about 43 quintillion. To put this into perspective, if one had one standard-sized Rubik's Cube for each permutation, one could cover the Earth's surface 275 times, or stack them in a tower 261 light-years high.

The preceding figure is limited to permutations that can be reached solely by turning the sides of the cube. If the permutations reached through disassembly of the cube are considered, the number becomes twelve times larger:
$${8! \times 3^8 \times 12! \times 2^{12}} = 519{,}024{,}039{,}293{,}878{,}272{,}000$$
or approximately 519 quintillion possible arrangements of the pieces that make up the cube, but only one-twelfth of these are actually solvable. This is because there is no sequence of moves that will swap a single pair of pieces or rotate a single corner or edge cube. Thus, there are 12 possible sets of reachable configurations, sometimes called "universes" or "orbits", into which the cube can be placed by dismantling and reassembling it.

The preceding numbers assume the centre faces are in a fixed position. If turning the whole cube is considered a different permutation, then each of the preceding numbers should be multiplied by 24. A chosen colour can be on one of six sides, and then one of the adjacent colours can be in one of four positions; this determines the positions of all remaining colours.

=== Centre faces ===
The original Rubik's Cube had no orientation markings on the centre faces (although some carried the "Rubik's Cube" mark on the centre square of the white face), and therefore solving it does not require any attention to orienting those faces correctly. However, the central squares of an unscrambled Cube can be marked with four coloured marks on each edge, each corresponding to the colour of the adjacent face; a cube marked in this way is referred to as a "supercube". Some Cubes have also been produced commercially with markings on all of the squares, such as the Luoshu Square or playing card suits. Cubes have also been produced where the nine stickers on a face are used to make a single larger picture, and centre orientation matters on these as well. Thus one can nominally solve a Cube yet have the markings on the centres rotated; it then becomes an additional test to solve the centres as well.

Marking Rubik's Cube's centres increases its difficulty, because this expands the set of distinguishable possible configurations. There are 4^{6}/2 (2,048) ways to orient the centres since an even permutation of the corners implies an even number of quarter turns of centres as well. In particular, when the Cube is unscrambled apart from the orientations of the central squares, there will always be an even number of centre squares requiring a quarter turn. Thus orientations of centres increases the total number of possible Cube permutations from 43,252,003,274,489,856,000 (4.3×10^{19}) to 88,580,102,706,155,225,088,000 (8.9×10^{22}).

When turning a cube over is considered to be a change in permutation then we must also count arrangements of the centre faces. Nominally there are 6! ways to arrange the six centre faces of the cube, but only 24 of these are achievable without disassembly of the cube. When the orientations of centres are also counted, as above, this increases the total number of possible Cube permutations from 88,580,102,706,155,225,088,000 (8.9×10^{22}) to 2,125,922,464,947,725,402,112,000 (2.1×10^{24}).

=== Algorithms ===
In Rubik's cubers' parlance, a memorised sequence of moves that have a desired effect on the cube is called an "algorithm". This terminology is derived from the mathematical use of algorithm, meaning a list of well-defined instructions for performing a task from a given initial state, through well-defined successive states, to a desired end-state. Each method of solving the Cube employs its own set of algorithms, together with descriptions of what effect the algorithm has, and when it can be used to bring the cube closer to being solved.

Many algorithms are designed to transform only a small part of the cube without interfering with other parts that have already been solved so that they can be applied repeatedly to different parts of the cube until the whole is solved. For example, there are well-known algorithms for cycling three corners without changing the rest of the puzzle or flipping the orientation of a pair of edges while leaving the others intact.

Some algorithms do have a certain desired effect on the cube (for example, swapping two corners) but may also have the side-effect of changing other parts of the cube (such as permuting some edges). Such algorithms are often simpler than the ones without side effects and are employed early on in the solution when most of the puzzle has not yet been solved and the side effects are not important. Towards the end of the solution, the more specific (and usually more complicated) algorithms are used instead.

=== Relevance and application of mathematical group theory ===
Rubik's Cube lends itself to the application of mathematical group theory, which has been helpful for deducing certain algorithms – in particular, those which have a commutator structure, namely XYX^{−1}Y^{−1} (where X and Y are specific moves or move-sequences and X^{−1} and Y^{−1} are their respective inverses), or a conjugate structure, namely XYX^{−1}, often referred to by speedcubers colloquially as a "setup move". In addition, the fact that there are well-defined subgroups within the Rubik's Cube group enables the puzzle to be learned and mastered by moving up through various self-contained "levels of difficulty". For example, one such "level" could involve solving cubes that have been scrambled using only 180-degree turns. These subgroups are the principle underlying the computer cubing methods by Thistlethwaite and Kociemba, which solve the cube by further reducing it to another subgroup.

=== Unitary representation ===
The Rubik's group can be endowed with a unitary representation: such a description allows the Rubik's Cube to be mapped into a quantum system of few particles, where the rotations of its faces are implemented by unitary operators. The rotations of the faces act as generators of the Lie group.

== Solutions ==
=== Singmaster notation ===
Many 3×3×3 Rubik's Cube enthusiasts use a notation developed by David Singmaster to denote a sequence of moves, referred to as "Singmaster notation" or simple "Cube notation". Its relative nature allows algorithms to be written in such a way that they can be applied regardless of which side is designated the top or how the colours are organised on a particular cube.

- F (Front): the side currently facing the solver
- B (Back): the side opposite the front
- U (Up): the side above or on top of the front side
- D (Down): the side opposite the top, underneath the Cube
- L (Left): the side directly to the left of the front
- R (Right): the side directly to the right of the front
- f (Front two layers): the side facing the solver and the corresponding middle layer
- b (Back two layers): the side opposite the front and the corresponding middle layer
- u (Up two layers): the top side and the corresponding middle layer
- d (Down two layers): the bottom layer and the corresponding middle layer
- l (Left two layers): the side to the left of the front and the corresponding middle layer
- r (Right two layers): the side to the right of the front and the corresponding middle layer
- x (rotate): rotate the entire Cube on R
- y (rotate): rotate the entire Cube on U
- z (rotate): rotate the entire Cube on F

When a prime symbol ( ′ ) follows a letter, it indicates an anticlockwise face turn; while a letter without a prime symbol denotes a clockwise turn. These directions are as one is looking at the specified face. A letter followed by a 2 (occasionally a superscript ^{2}) denotes two turns, or a 180-degree turn. For example, R means to turn the right side clockwise, but R′ means to turn the right side anticlockwise. The letters x, y, and z are used to indicate that the entire Cube should be turned about one of its axes, corresponding to R, U, and F turns respectively. When x, y, or z is primed, it is an indication that the cube must be rotated in the opposite direction. When x, y, or z is squared, the cube must be rotated 180 degrees.

One of the most common deviations from Singmaster notation, and in fact the current official standard, is to use "w", for "wide", instead of lowercase letters to represent moves of two layers; thus, a move of Rw is equivalent to one of r.

For methods using middle-layer turns (particularly corners-first methods), there is a generally accepted "MES" extension to the notation where letters M, E, and S denote middle layer turns. It was used e.g. in Marc Waterman's Algorithm.

- M (Middle): the layer between L and R, turn direction as L (top-down)
- E (Equator): the layer between U and D, turn direction as D (left-right)
- S (Standing): the layer between F and B, turn direction as F

The 4×4×4 and larger cubes use an extended notation to refer to the additional middle layers. Generally speaking, uppercase letters (F B U D L R) refer to the outermost portions of the cube (called faces). Lowercase letters (f b u d l r) refer to the inner portions of the cube (called slices). An asterisk (L*), a number in front of it (2L), or two layers in parentheses (Ll), means to turn the two layers at the same time (both the inner and the outer left faces) For example: (Rr)' l2 f' means to turn the two rightmost layers anticlockwise, then the left inner layer twice, and then the inner front layer anticlockwise. By extension, for cubes of 6×6×6 and larger, moves of three layers are notated by the number 3, for example, 3L.

Another notation appeared in the 1981 book The Simple Solution to Rubik's Cube. Singmaster notation was not widely known at the time of publication. The faces were named Top (T), Bottom (B), Left (L), Right (R), Front (F), and Posterior (P), with + for clockwise, – for anticlockwise, and 2 for 180-degree turns.

Another notation appeared in the 1982 "The Ideal Solution" book for Rubik's Revenge. Horizontal planes were noted as tables, with table 1 or T1 starting at the top. Vertical front to back planes were noted as books, with book 1 or B1 starting from the left. Vertical left to right planes were noted as windows, with window 1 or W1 starting at the front. Using the front face as a reference view, table moves were left or right, book moves were up or down, and window moves were clockwise or anticlockwise.

=== Period of move sequences ===
The repetition of any given move sequence on a cube which is initially in solved state will eventually return the cube back to its solved state: the smallest number of iterations required is the period of the sequence. For example, the 180-degree turn of any side has period 2 (e.g. {U^{2}}^{2}); the 90-degree turn of any side has period 4 (e.g. {R}^{4}). The maximum period for a move sequence is 1260: for example, allowing for full rotations, {F x}^{1260} or {R y}^{1260} or {U z}^{1260}; not allowing for rotations, {D R' U^{2} M}^{1260}, or {B E L' F^{2}}^{1260}, or {S' U' B D^{2}}^{1260}; only allowing for clockwise quarter turns, {U R S U L}^{1260}, or {F L E B L}^{1260}, or {R U R D S}^{1260}; only allowing for lateral clockwise quarter turns, {F B L F B R F U}^{1260}, or {U D R U D L U F}^{1260}, or {R L D R L U R F}^{1260}.

=== Optimal solutions ===
Although there are a significant number of possible permutations for Rubik's Cube, a number of solutions have been developed which allow solving the cube in well under 100 moves.

Many general solutions for the Cube have been discovered independently. David Singmaster first published his solution in the book Notes on Rubik's "Magic Cube" in 1981. This solution involves solving the Cube layer by layer, in which one layer (designated the top) is solved first, followed by the middle layer, and then the final and bottom layer. After sufficient practice, solving the Cube layer by layer can be done in under one minute. Other general solutions include "corners first" methods or combinations of several other methods. In 1982, David Singmaster and Alexander Frey hypothesised that the number of moves needed to solve the Cube, given an ideal algorithm, might be in "the low twenties". In 2007, Daniel Kunkle and Gene Cooperman used computer search methods to demonstrate that any 3×3×3 Rubik's Cube configuration can be solved in 26 moves or fewer. In 2008, Tomas Rokicki lowered that number to 22 moves, and in July 2010, a team of researchers including Rokicki, working with computers provided by Google, proved that the so-called "God's number" for Rubik's Cube is 20. This means that all initial configurations can be solved in 20 moves or less, and some (in fact millions) require 20. More generally, it has been shown that an n×n×n Rubik's Cube can be solved optimally in Θ(n^{2} / log(n)) moves.

=== Speedcubing methods ===
The method most commonly used by speedcubers today is CFOP, commonly attributed to Jessica Fridrich. CFOP stands for "Cross, F2L, OLL, PLL". It is similar to the layer-by-layer method but employs the use of a large number of algorithms, especially for orienting and permuting the last layer. The cross is solved first, followed by first layer corners and second layer edges simultaneously, with each corner paired up with a second-layer edge piece, thus completing the first two layers (F2L). This is then followed by orienting the last layer, then permuting the last layer (OLL and PLL respectively). There are a total of 120 algorithms for the CFOP method, however they are not all required to use the CFOP method—cubers tend to complete F2L intuitively rather than by memorizing set algorithms. OLL consists of 57 algorithms, and PLL consists of 21 algorithms; there are 41 possible F2L cases. Most dedicated cubers will learn as many of these algorithms as possible, and most advanced cubers know all of them. If a cuber knows every algorithm for OLL, they may be described as knowing full OLL. It is the same for PLL and F2L. CFOP is sometimes referred to as Fridrich's method, as Jessica Fridrich popularized the method through her online website started in 1996. Fridrich herself did develop algorithms for OLL and PLL (alongside others), but F2L traces to several authors including John Conway, David Seal, and David Benson in 1979.

A now well-known method was developed by Lars Petrus. In this method, a 2×2×2 section is solved first, followed by a 2×2×3, and then the incorrect edges are solved using a three-move algorithm, which eliminates the need for a possible 32-move algorithm later. The principle behind this is that in layer-by-layer, one must constantly break and fix the completed layer(s); the 2×2×2 and 2×2×3 sections allow three or two layers (respectively) to be turned without ruining progress. One of the advantages of this method is that it tends to give solutions in fewer moves. For this reason, the method is also popular for fewest move competitions.

The Roux Method, developed by Gilles Roux, is similar to the Petrus method in that it relies on block building rather than layers, but derives from corners-first methods. In Roux, a 3×2×1 block is solved on either the left or right-hand side, followed by another 3×2×1 on the opposite side. Next, the corners of the top layer are solved. The cube can then be solved using only moves of the U layer and M slice.

=== Beginners' methods ===
Most beginner solution methods involve solving the cube one layer at a time ("layer-by-layer" method or "beginner's method"), using algorithms that preserve what has already been solved. The easiest layer-by-layer methods require only 3–8 algorithms.

In 1981, thirteen-year-old Patrick Bossert developed a solution for solving the cube, along with a graphical notation, designed to be easily understood by novices. It was subsequently published as You Can Do The Cube and became a best-seller.

In 1997, Denny Dedmore published a solution described using diagrammatic icons representing the moves to be made, instead of the usual notation.

Philip Marshall's The Ultimate Solution to Rubik's Cube takes a different approach, averaging only 65 twists yet requiring the memorisation of only two algorithms. The cross is solved first, followed by the remaining edges (using the Edge Piece Series FR'F'R), then five corners (using the Corner Piece Series URU'L'UR'U'L, which is the same as the typical last layer corner permutation algorithm), and finally the last three corners.

=== Rubik's Cube solver programs ===
The fastest move optimal online Rubik's Cube solver program uses Michael Feather's two-phase algorithm. The fastest suboptimal online Rubik's Cube solver which can typically determine a solution of 20 moves or fewer uses an optimized version of Herbert Kociemba's two-phase algorithm. The user has to set the colour configuration of the scrambled cube, and the program returns the steps required to solve it in the half-turn metric.

== Competitions and records ==
=== Speedcubing competitions ===
Speedsolve at a speedcubing competition, 2010

Speedcubing (or speedsolving) is the practice of trying to solve a Rubik's Cube in the shortest time possible. There are a number of speedcubing competitions that take place around the world.

A speedcubing championship organised by Guinness World Records was held in Munich on 13 March 1981. The contest used standardised scrambling and fixed inspection times, and the winners were Ronald Brinkmann and Jury Fröschl with times of 38.0 seconds. The first world championship was the 1982 World Rubik's Cube Championship held in Budapest on 5 June 1982, which was won by Minh Thai, a Vietnamese student from Los Angeles, with a time of 22.95 seconds.

Since 2003, the winner of a competition has been determined by taking a trimmed average of five solves, removing the slowest and fastest. The single best time is usually also recorded. The World Cube Association maintains a history of world records. In 2005, the WCA introduced a requirement to use a special timing device, known as a StackMat Timer, for any solve to be officially counted.

In addition to the main 3×3×3 event, the WCA also holds events where the cube is solved in different ways:

- Blindfolded solving
- Multiple blindfolded solving, or "multi-blind", in which the contestant solves any number of cubes blindfolded in a row
- Solving the cube using a single hand, or "one-handed (OH)" solving
- Solving the cube in the fewest possible moves, also known as Fewest Moves Challenge (FMC)

In blindfolded solving, the contestant first studies the scrambled cube (i.e., looking at it normally with no blindfold), and is then blindfolded before beginning to turn the cube's faces. Their recorded time for this event includes both the time spent memorizing the cube and the time spent solving it.

In multiple blindfolded solving, all of the cubes are memorised, and then all of the cubes are solved once blindfolded; thus, the main challenge is memorising many – often ten or more – separate cubes. The event is scored not by time, but by the number of points achieved within the time limit. The time limit is determined by the amount of cubes in the attempt; if the competitor is attempting to solve less than 6 cubes, the time limit is 10 minutes per cube. The time limit is 1 hour if the competitor is attempting to solve 6 cubes or more. The number of points achieved is equal to the number of cubes solved correctly minus the number of cubes unsolved after the end of the attempt, where a greater number of points is better. If multiple competitors achieve the same number of points, their rankings are assessed based on the total time of the attempt, with a shorter time being better.

In fewest moves solving, the contestant is given a set of moves that scramble the cube (a "scramble"), and they have one hour to write down the shortest solution to the cube they can find.

=== Records ===
==== Competition records ====
- Single time: The world record time for solving a 3×3×3 Rubik's Cube is 2.51 seconds, held by Xuanyi Geng (耿暄一) of China, broken on 4–5 October 2026 at Guangzhou Grand Open 2026.
- Average time: The world record average of the middle three of five solve times (which excludes the fastest and slowest) is 3.51 seconds, set by Yiheng Wang (王艺衡) of China on 17 June 2026 at the Hefei Cubing League 3×3 III 2026 cubing competition in Hefei, Anhui, China.
- One-handed solving: The world record fastest one-handed solve is 5.62 seconds, set by Patrick Ponce of the United States on 14–16 August 2026 at Mid-Atlantic Speedcubing Championship 2026 in Dover, Delaware. The world record fastest average of five one-handed solves is 6.99 seconds, set by Zhen Chen (陈震) of China on 25 July 2026 at Wuhu Open 2026.
- Blindfold solving: The world record fastest Rubik's Cube solve blindfolded is 11.56 seconds (including memorization), set by Tommy Cherry of the United States of America on 27–28 January 2026 at Mid-Atlantic Quiet Championship 2026 in Branchburg, New Jersey. The world record mean of three for blindfold solving is 13.97 seconds, set also by Tommy Cherry on 15 August 2026 at Hefei August Open 2026 in Hefei, China.
- Multiple blindfold solving: The world record for multiple Rubik's Cube solving blindfolded is 63 out of 65 cubes in 58 minutes and 23 seconds, set by Graham Siggins of the United States on 18 October 2025 at Please Be Quiet Reno 2025.
- Fewest moves solving: The world record of fewest moves to solve a cube, given one hour to determine one's solution, is 16, which was achieved by Sebastiano Tronto of Italy on 15 June 2019 at FMC 2019, Aeden Bryant of the USA on 23 June 2024 at Ashfield Summer Challenge 2024, Levi Gibson of the USA on 23 June 2024 at Ashfield Summer Challenge 2024, Jacob Sherwen Brown of the UK on 26 October 2024 at Rubik's UK Championship FMC 2024, and Riccardo Raciti of Slovakia on November 21 2026 at FMC Italy 2026. The world record mean of three for the fewest moves challenge is 19, set by Brian Johnson of the USA in May 2026 at Evanston FMC Spring 2026.

==== Other records ====
- Non-human solving: The fastest non-human Rubik's Cube solve was performed by Rubik's Contraption, a robot made by Ben Katz and Jared Di Carlo. A YouTube video shows a 0.38-second solving time using a Nucleo with the min2phase algorithm.
- Highest order physical n×n×n cube solving: Jeremy Smith solved a 21x21x21 in 95 minutes and 55.52 seconds.
- Group solving (12 minutes): The record for most people solving a Rubik's Cube at once in twelve minutes is 134, set on 17 March 2010 by schoolboys from Dr Challoner's Grammar School, Amersham, England, breaking the previous Guinness World Record of 96 people at once.
- Group solving (30 minutes): On 21 November 2012, at the O2 Arena in London, 1414 people, mainly students from schools across London, solved Rubik's Cube in under 30 minutes, breaking the previous Guinness World Record of 937. The event was hosted by Depaul UK.

On 4 November 2012, 3248 people, mainly students of the College of Engineering Pune, successfully solved Rubik's cube in 30 minutes on college ground. The successful attempt is recorded in the Limca Book of Records. The college will submit the relevant data, witness statements and video of the event to Guinness authorities.

== Variations ==
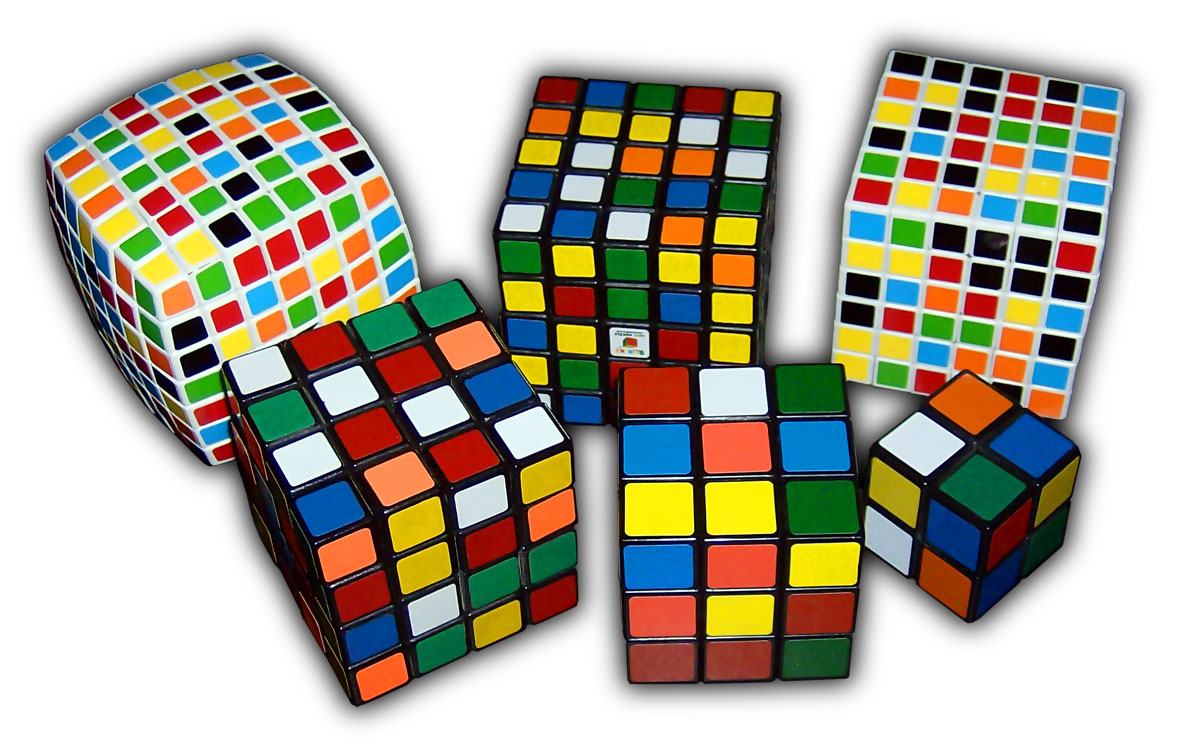
Scrambled variations of Rubik's Cubes. Top row: V-Cube 7, Professor's Cube, V-Cube 6. Bottom row: Rubik's Revenge, original Rubik's Cube, Pocket Cube. Clicking on a cube will redirect to the respective page.

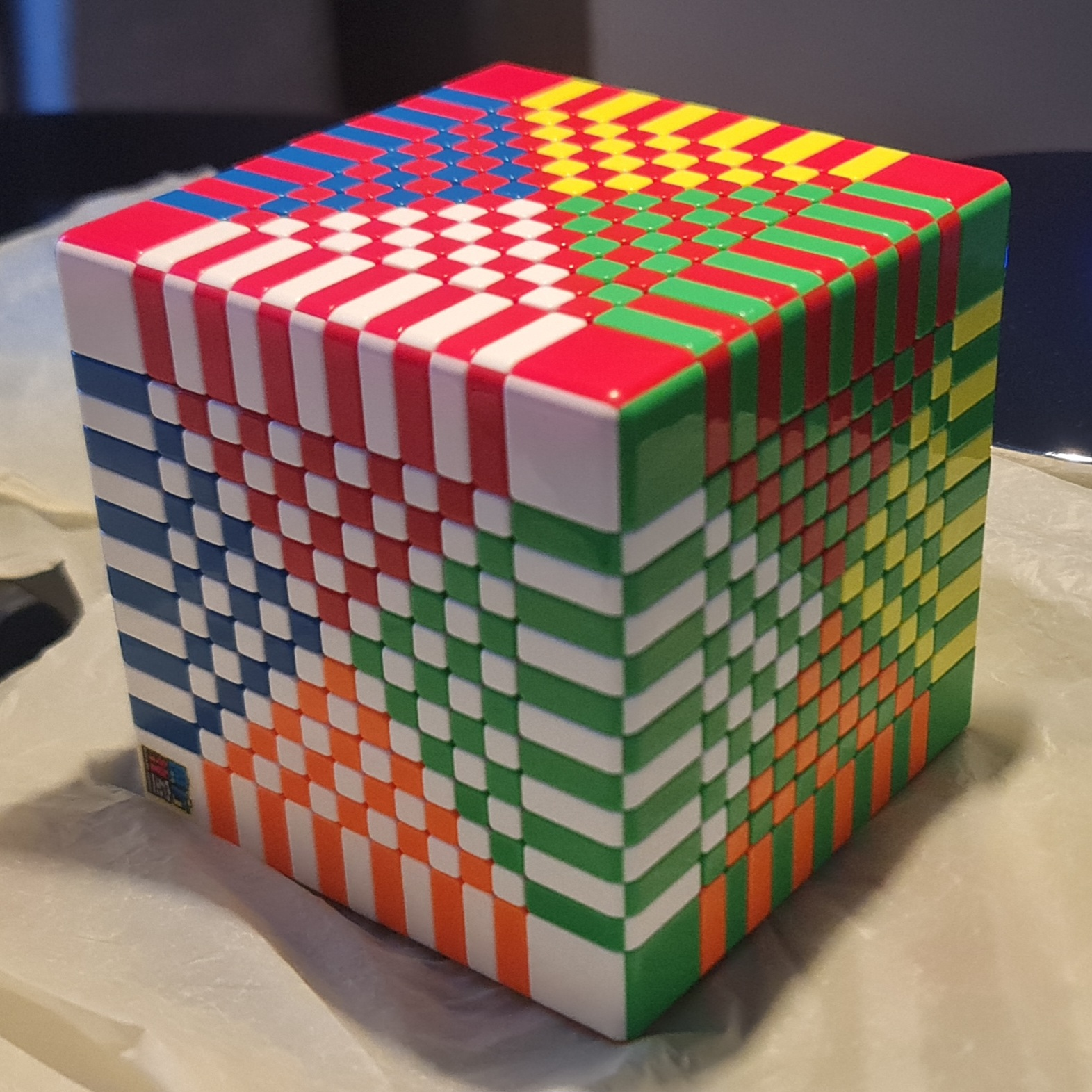
A 13×13×13 cube

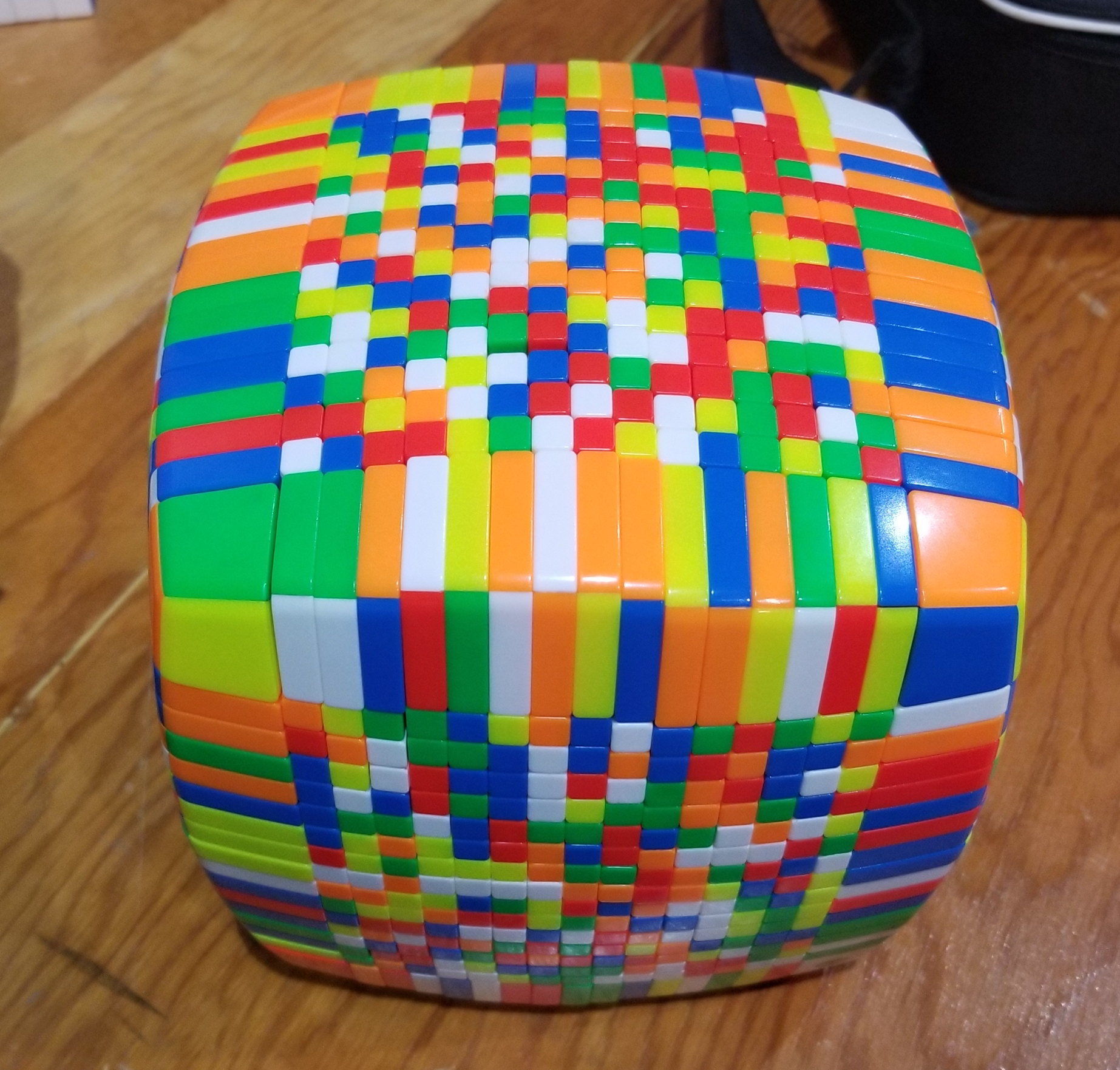
A 17×17×17 cube

There are many different variations of Rubik's Cubes. The most common class of variants changes the "order" of the cube, defined by the number of layers in each dimension or equivalently by the number of pieces along each edge (including corners). The 2×2×2 (Pocket/Mini Cube), the standard 3×3×3 cube, the 4×4×4 (Rubik's Revenge/Master Cube), and the 5×5×5 (Professor's Cube) are the most well known, as they are all available under the official Rubik's brand. The WCA sanctions speedsolving competitions for cube orders up to 7×7×7. These "big cubes" represent about the limit of practicality for the purpose of competitive speedsolving, as the cubes become increasingly ungainly and prone to mechanical failure (such as "popping", where one or more pieces become dislodged from the puzzle), and average solve times increase quadratically with each larger order, in proportion to the number of total "facelets" of the cube.

Even larger cubes based on the V-Cube patents are commercially available to the mass-market from non-licensed manufacturers, most of them Chinese firms which also produce popular cubes designed for speed-solving. The 17×17×17 "Over the Top" cube (available late 2011) was, until December 2017, the largest commercially sold cube, and the most expensive, costing over US$2000. A mass-produced 17×17×17 was later introduced by the Chinese manufacturer YuXin. A working design for a 22×22×22 cube exists and was demonstrated in January 2016, a 33×33×33 in December 2017, and a 49×49×49 in August 2024, though designs this large are not currently mass-produced. Chinese manufacturer ShengShou has been producing cubes in all sizes from 2×2×2 to 15×15×15 (as of May 2020), and has also come out with a 17×17×17. The largest currently mass-produced cube is 21×21×21, made by MoYu beginning in 2021, and costing between $1100 and $1600.

There are many variations of the original cube, some of which are made by Rubik. The mechanical products include Rubik's Magic, 360, and Twist. There are electronic variants such as Rubik's Revolution and Slide that were also inspired by the original. One of the 3×3×3 Cube variants is Rubik's TouchCube. Sliding a finger across its faces causes its patterns of coloured lights to rotate the same way they would on a mechanical cube. The TouchCube also has buttons for hints and self-solving, and it includes a charging stand. The TouchCube was introduced at the American International Toy Fair in New York on 15 February 2009. Other electronic variations include Rubik's Connected cubes, which have an associated app that can track player times and give suggestions, and the WOWCube, which has screens instead of stickers and supports dozens of other games.

The Cube has inspired an entire category of similar puzzles, commonly referred to as twisty puzzles, which includes the cubes of different sizes mentioned above, as well as various other geometric shapes. Some such shapes include the tetrahedron (Pyraminx), the octahedron (Skewb Diamond), the dodecahedron (Megaminx), and the icosahedron (Dogic). There are also puzzles that change shape such as Rubik's Snake and the Square One.

In 2011, Guinness World Records awarded the "largest order Rubiks magic cube" to a 17×17×17 cube, made by Oskar van Deventer. On 2 December 2017, Grégoire Pfennig announced that he had broken this record, with a 33×33×33 cube, and that his claim had been submitted to Guinness for verification. On 8 April 2018, Grégoire Pfennig announced another world record, the 2×2×50 cube. Whether this is a replacement for the 33×33×33 record, or an additional record, remains to be seen. Pfennig's record was later broken on 30 March 2024 when Preston Alden unveiled his 49×49×49 cube on his YouTube channel and recognized by Guinness.

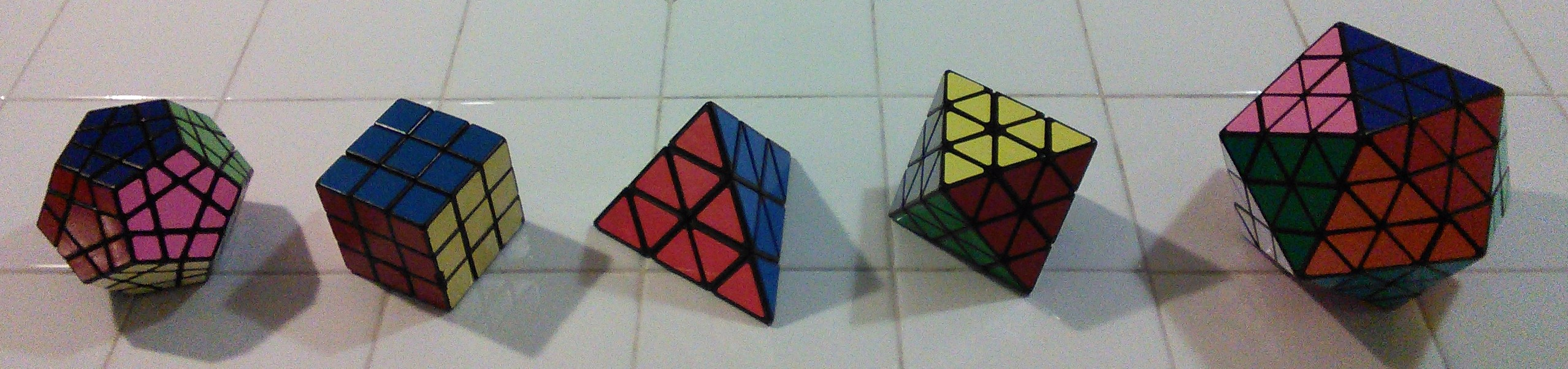
All five platonic solids represented by twisty puzzles

Some puzzles have also been created in the shape of Kepler–Poinsot polyhedra, such as Alexander's Star (a great dodecahedron). Grégoire Pfennig has also created at least one puzzle in the shape of a small stellated dodecahedron.

=== Custom-built puzzles ===
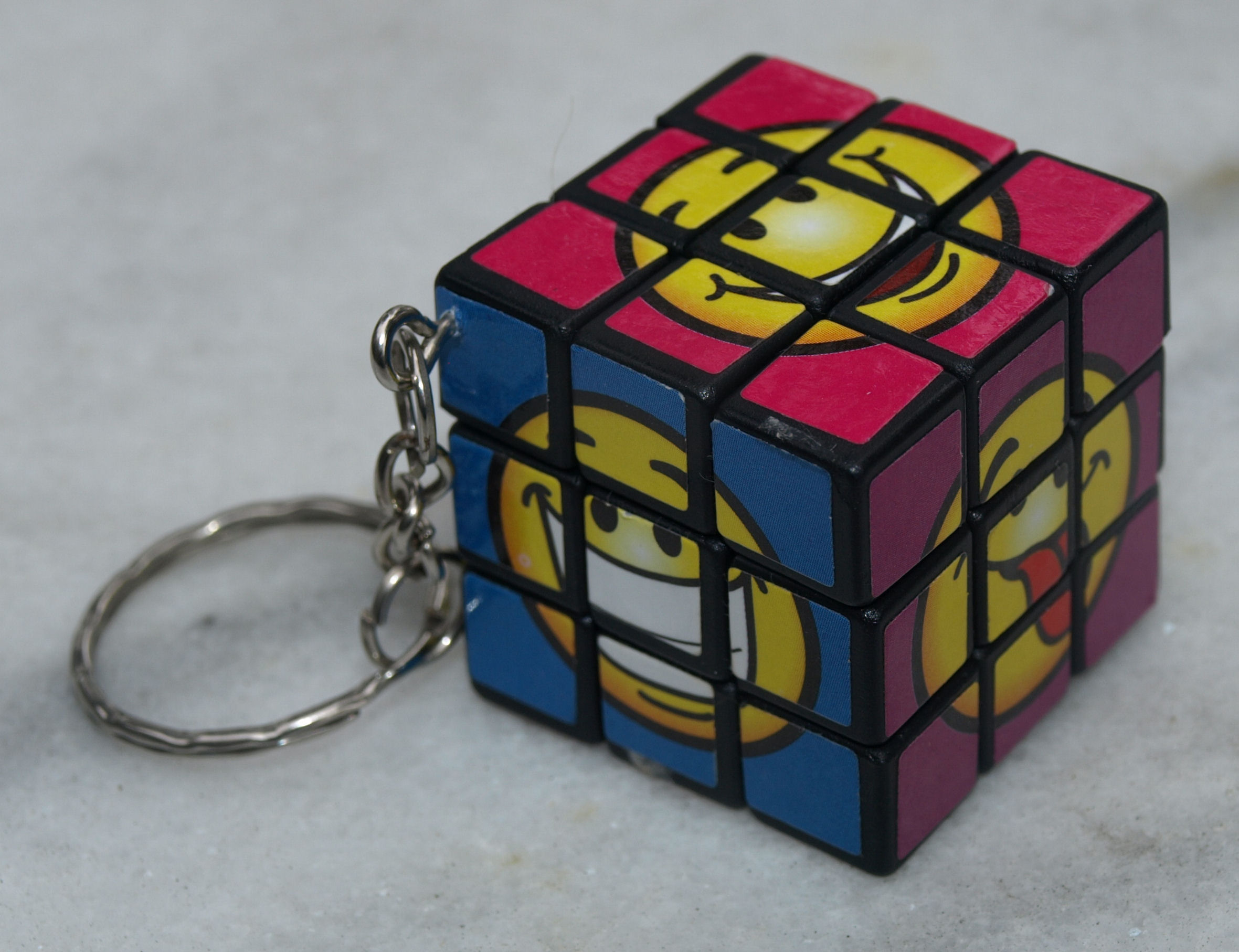
Novelty keychain

Puzzles have been built resembling Rubik's Cube, or based on its inner workings. For example, a cuboid is a puzzle based on Rubik's Cube, but with different functional dimensions, such as 2×2×4, 2×3×4, and 3×3×5.

Other Rubik's Cube modifications include "shape mods", cubes that have been extended or truncated to form a new shape. An example of this is the Trabjer's Octahedron, which can be built by truncating and extending portions of a regular 3×3×3. Most shape modifications can be adapted to higher-order cubes. In the case of Tony Fisher's Rhombic Dodecahedron, there are 3×3×3, 4×4×4, 5×5×5, and 6×6×6 versions of the puzzle.

=== Rubik's Cube software ===
Puzzles like Rubik's Cube can be simulated by computer software to provide very large puzzles that are impractical to build, as well as virtual puzzles that cannot be physically built, such as many higher dimensional analogues of the Rubik's Cube. Google has released the Chrome Cube Lab in association with Ernő Rubik. The site has various interactive objects based on Rubik's Cube. Customised versions of Rubik's Cube can be created and uploaded.

== Exhibits and art ==
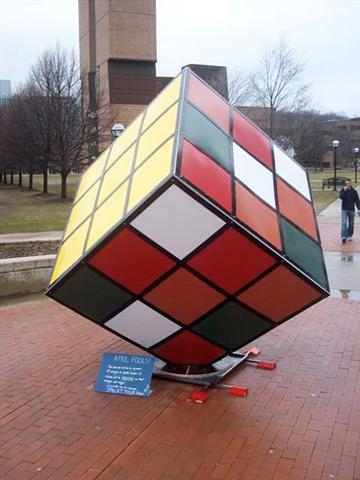
Large Rubik's Cube built on the University of Michigan's North Campus

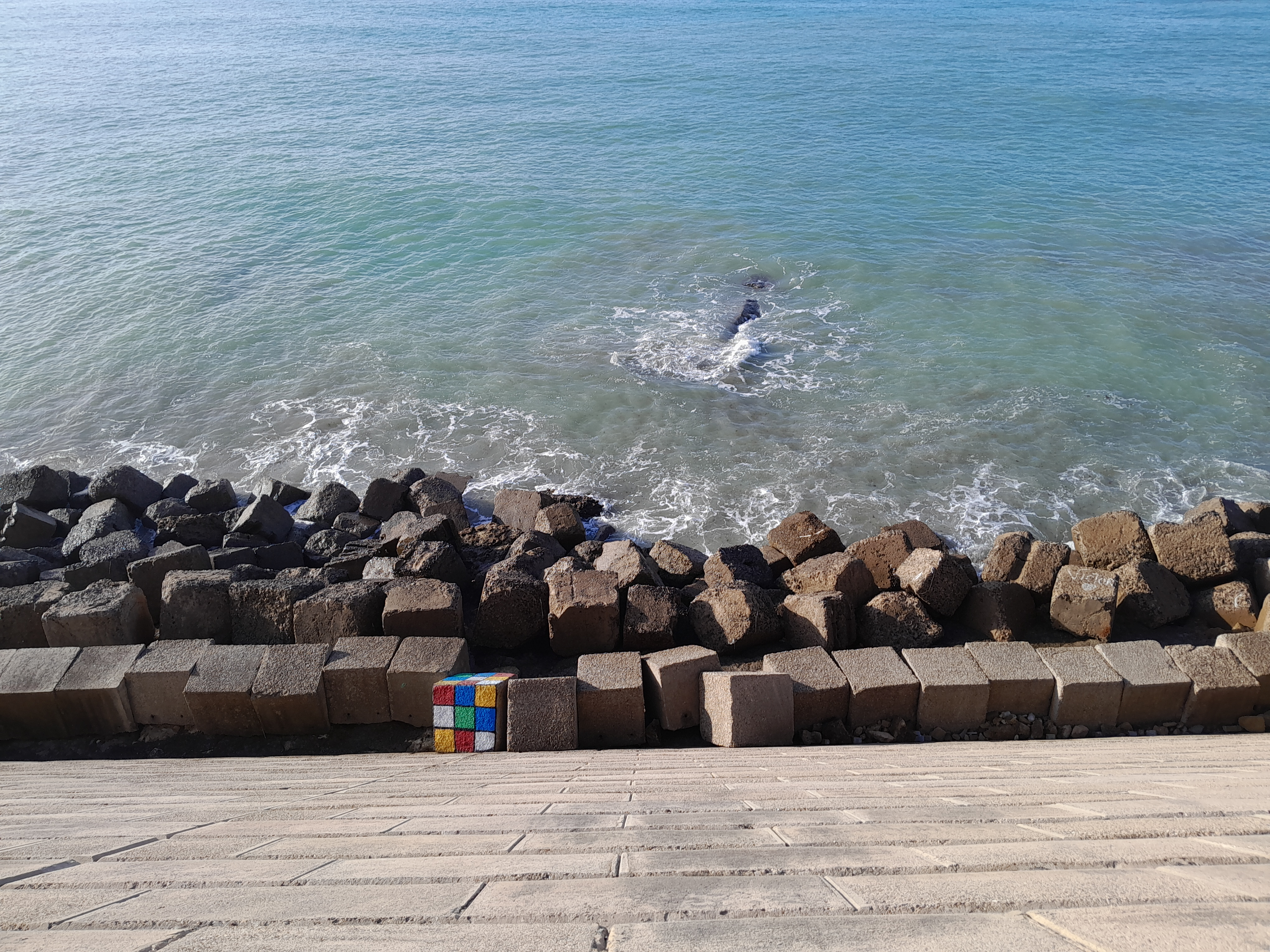
Rubik's Cube, as decoration, in Cádiz, Spain

Liberty Science Center in Jersey City, New Jersey, and Google designed an interactive exhibit based on the Rubik's Cube. It opened in April 2014 in celebration of the 40th anniversary of the Cube's invention before travelling internationally for seven years. Exhibition elements include a 35-foot-tall rooftop cube made of lights that people can manipulate with their cellphones, a $2.5 million cube made of diamonds, a giant walk-in cube displaying the inner workings of the puzzle, and cube-solving robots.

Probably from the earliest days of the Rubik's Cube craze in the 1980s people have assembled cubes to form simple art pieces, several early 'Folk Artists' are noted for their work. Rubik's Cubes have also been the subject of several pop art installations. Owing to their popularity as a children's toy several artists and groups have created large Rubik's Cubes.

Tony Rosenthal's Alamo (The Astor Place Cube) is a spinnable statue of a Cube standing in New York City. Once the cube was covered with coloured panels so that it resembled a Rubik's Cube. Similarly, the University of Michigan students covered Endover creating a large Rubik's Cube on the University of Michigan's Central Campus for April Fool's Day in 2008.

=== Rubik's Cubism ===
Beyond Folk Art and oversized cube replicas, artists developed a pointillist art style using the cubes known as Rubik's Cube Art or Rubik's Cubism, which uses a standard Rubik's cube. The earliest recorded artworks appear to have been created by Fred Holly, a legally blind man in his 60s in the mid-1980s. These early pieces focus on geometrics and colour patterns. There does not appear to be other recorded art pieces until the mid-1990s by cube aficionados involved in the puzzle and game industry.

The Folk art form reached another level of its evolution with the development and maturity into a Pop art form consisting of pointillist Cube Art renderings. The street artist who uses the alias "Invader" or "Space Invader" started exhibiting pointillist pieces, including one of a man behind a desk and Mario Bros, using Rubik's Cube in June 2005 in an exhibition named 'Rubik Cubism' at Sixspace in Los Angeles. Prior to this exhibition the artist had used Rubik's Cubes to create giant Space Invaders. Another artist includes Robbie Mackinnon of Toronto Canada with earliest published work in 2007 who claims to have developed his pointillist Cube Art years earlier while being a teacher in China. Robbie Mackinnon's work has been exhibited in Ripley's Believe it or Not and focused on using pop-art, while Space Invader has exhibited his Cube Art alongside mosaic Space Invaders in commercial and public galleries.

In 2010 artist Pete Fecteau created "Dream Big", a tribute to Martin Luther King Jr. using 4,242 officially licensed Rubik's Cubes. Fecteau also worked with the organisation You Can Do The Rubik's Cube to create two separate guides designed to teach school children how to create Rubik's Cube mosaics from templates which he also created.

=== Music ===
Italian composer Maria Mannone created a cube called "CubeHarmonic" which has musical note names on its facets, creating different chord structures depending on its configuration.

== Reviews ==
- Games
- 1980 Games 100 in Games
- 1981 Games 100 in Games

== See also ==
- Mirror Blocks
- n-dimensional sequential move puzzle
- Rubik's Domino
- Rubik's family cubes of varying sizes
- Spatial ability
- V-Cube 8 (8×8×8)
