= Mirror Blocks =

Rubik's cube variant

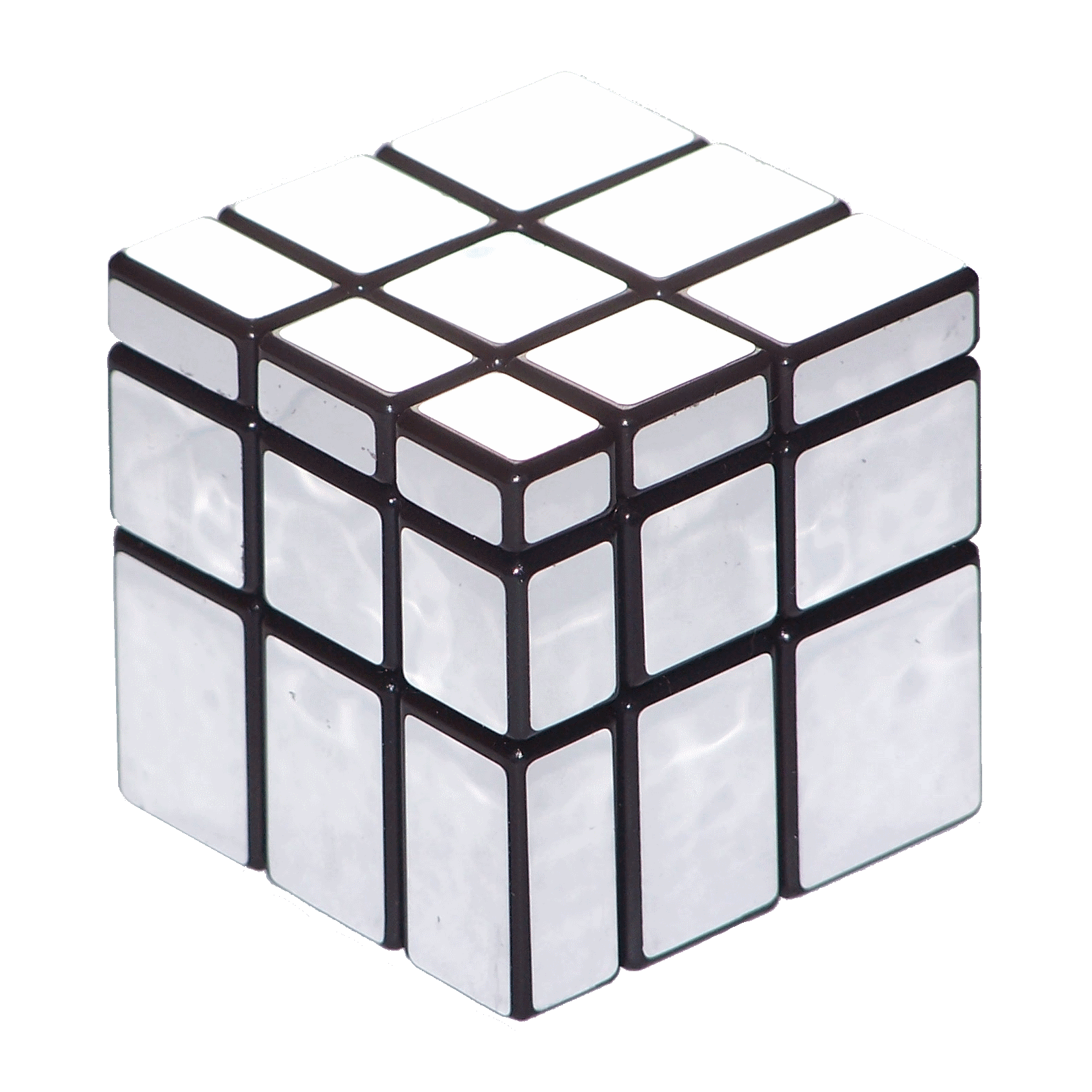
Mirror Cube solved

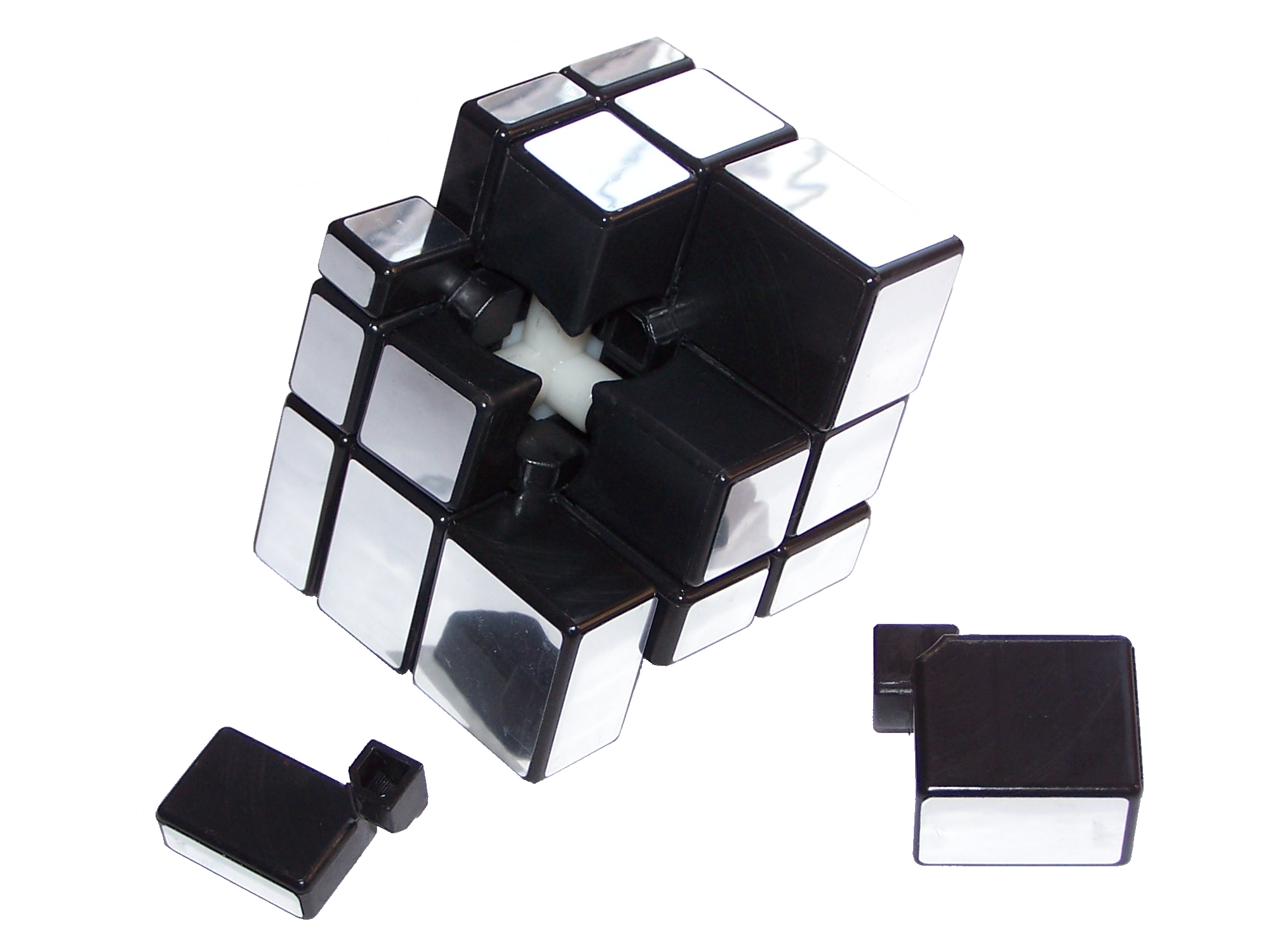
Mirror Cube disassembled

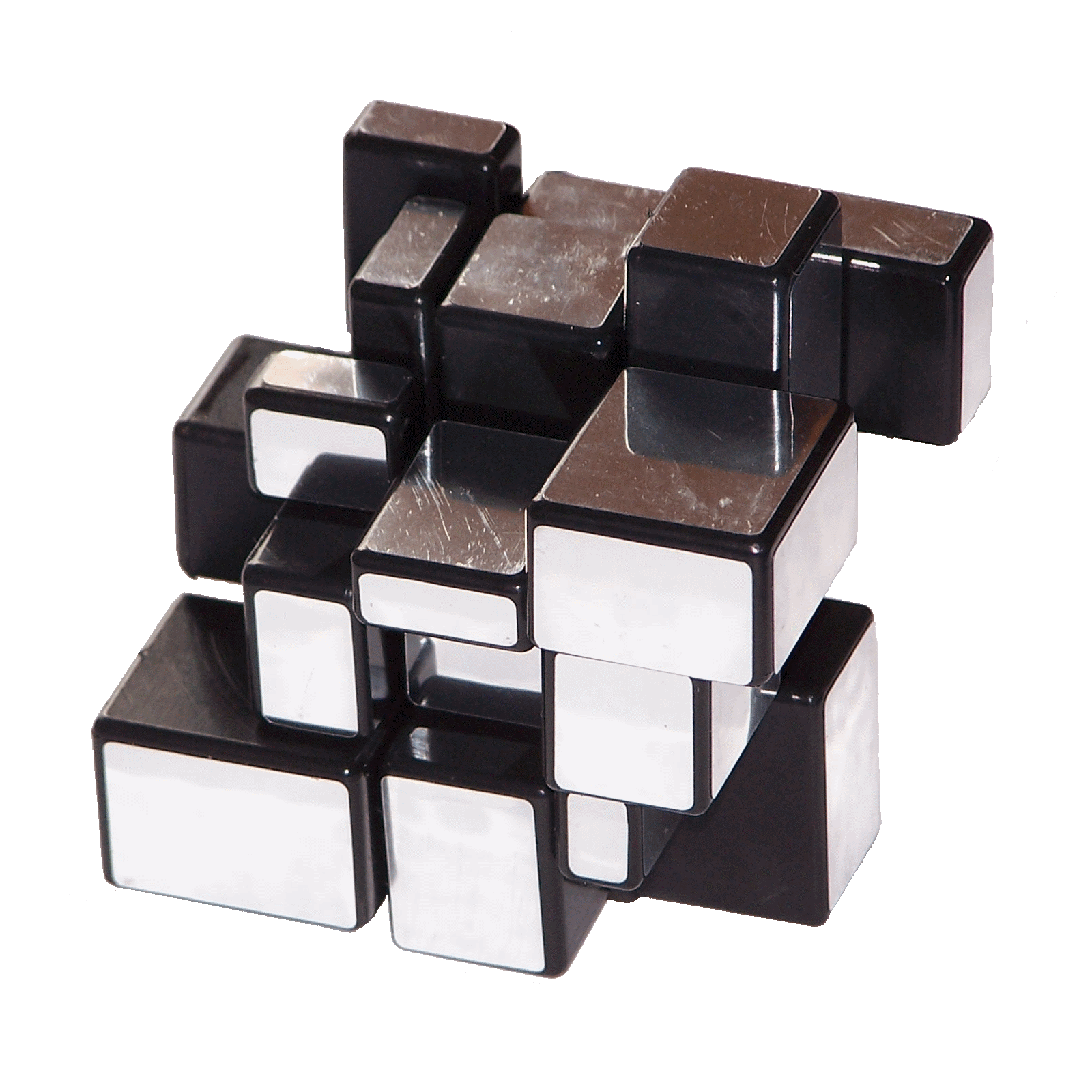
Mirror Cube scrambled

The Mirror Blocks, also known as the Mirror Cube and Bump Cube, is a type of combination puzzle and shape modification of the standard 3×3×3 Rubik's Cube and was invented in 2006. The puzzle's internal mechanism is nearly identical to that of the Rubik's Cube, although it differs from normal 3×3 cubes in that all pieces are the same color (typically reflective gold or silver stickers and/or tiles) and are identified by shape since each one is also a distinct rectangular prism. Like the Ghost Cube and Mastermorphix, the Mirror Blocks has a 3×3×3 shape, meaning that it can be solved the same way as the 3×3×3 Rubik's Cube. The fastest single solve for Mirror Blocks in a competition is 9.38 seconds and was achieved by Yutong Fang (方雨曈) in Xi'an, China on November 8, 2025.

== Origin ==
The Mirror Blocks was originally invented by Hidetoshi Takeji in 2006. He initially named the puzzle the "Bump Cube" due to it having an uneven, bumpy surface when scrambled. At a competition in Osaka, Hidetoshi showed his puzzle to a speedcuber who took great interest in it. Hidetoshi decided to lend his puzzle to the speedcuber, who showed it to a project group. In the fall of 2008, the puzzle was first mass-produced in Boston by Rubik's and manufactured by MegaHouse. When it was released, it was officially named the Mirror Blocks. Mirror Blocks have since been made by multiple manufacturers, and in versions with 4×4×4 and 5×5×5 mechanisms.
