= Layer-by-layer method =

Method of solving the Rubik's Cube

Layer-by-layer methods are a family of methods for solving the 3×3×3 Rubik's Cube. Such methods are the most frequently known as beginners' methods, as they are the methods most cubers learn initially, before advancing to speedcubing methods such as CFOP.

== History ==
The layer-by-layer approach was pioneered by David Singmaster in his 1980 book Notes on Rubik's "Magic Cube". The same idea was adopted by James G. Nourse in his The Simple Solution to Rubik's Cube which became the bestselling book of 1981, and similar approaches could be found in Don Taylor's Mastering Rubik's Cube and Cyril Östrop's Solving the Cube from the same era.

== Method ==
Layer-by-layer methods typically begin with the following steps (numbered as per the diagram below):

1. Forming a cross on one face, ensuring that all edge colours match the adjacent centre colours
2. Inserting the corners of the same face between the edges, thereby completing one layer
3. Inserting the edge pieces of the middle layer

The sequence of steps to complete the final layer varies between layer-by-layer methods. The diagram illustrates one possible sequence:

4. Flipping the edges, thus forming a cross on the face
5. Permuting the edges
6. Permuting the corners
7. Rotating the corners

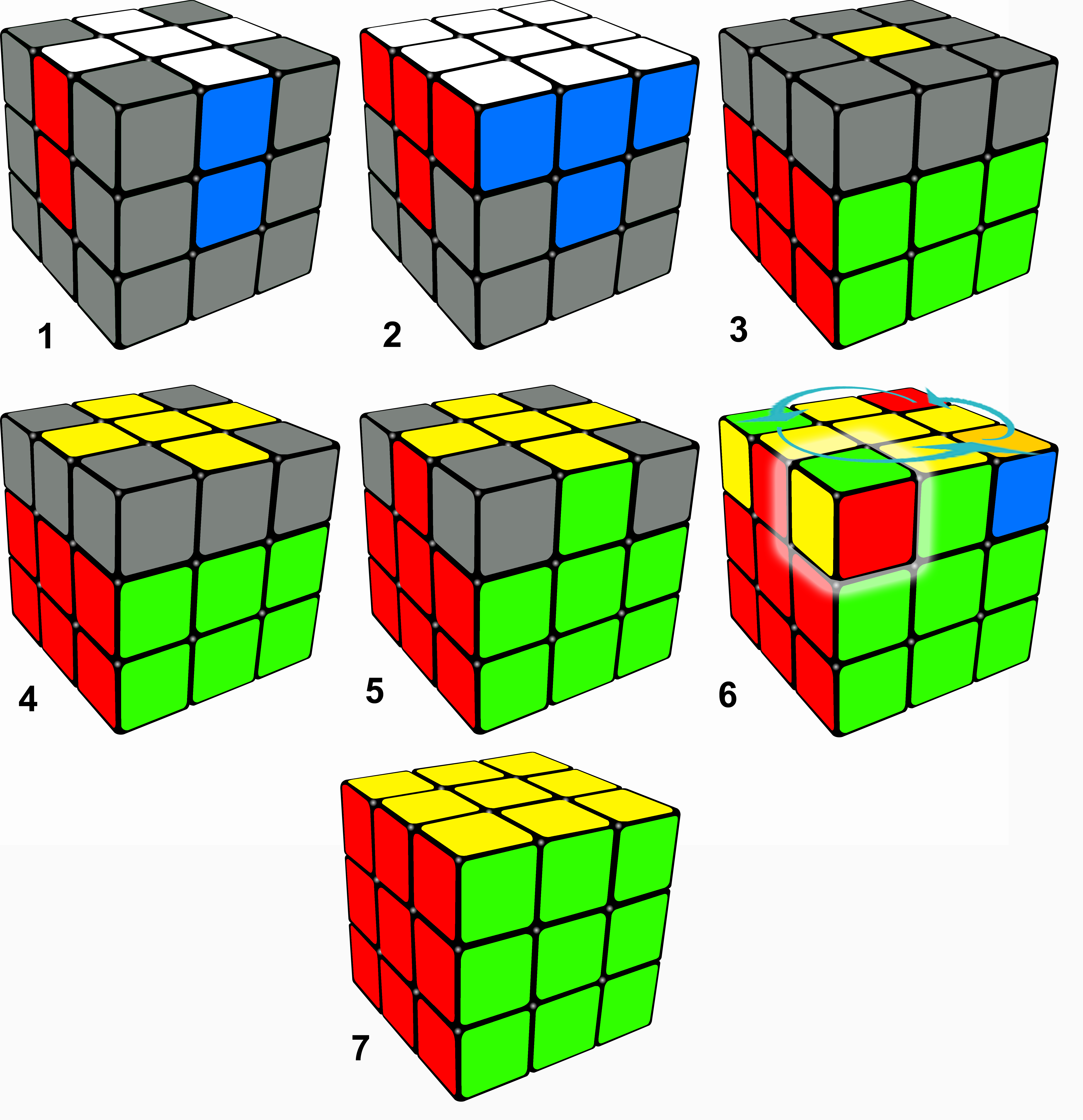
An overview of the layer by layer method for Rubik's Cube. The cube has been turned over in the third step.

Suitable algorithms to use in the final-layer phase of a layer-by-layer method depend on the sequence of steps, because many algorithms make other changes to pieces in the top layer as a side effect. For example, some corner-permutation algorithms (such as L' U R U' L U R' U) also rotate the corners, so can only be used in a method that permutes corners before rotating them. Some edge-flipping algorithms (such as F R U R' U' F') also rotate corners and rearrange both corner and edge pieces in the final layer, so are suitable only when flipping edges is the first of the final-layer steps to be performed.

== CFOP method ==
The CFOP speedcubing technique, developed by Jessica Fridrich and others in the 1980s, combines into a single step each of steps 2 and 3, steps 5 and 6 and steps 4 and 7 in the above sequence. However, the method uses many more algorithms than most layer-by-layer methods, making it harder to learn, but faster to execute once mastered.

== See also ==
- CFOP method
- Rubik's Cube
