= Lars Petrus =

Swedish speedcuber (born 1960)

Lars Erik Petrus (born 4 November 1960) is a Swedish accomplished speedcuber. He has been described as a Rubik's Cube icon and master.

== Information ==
Petrus grew up in Gammelstaden just outside of Luleå.

He took up speedcubing in the early 1980s, learning it over the course of a summer when he was unemployed. In 1982, he became the national champion of Sweden, and went on to finish fourth overall at the first official Rubik's Cube World Championships held in Budapest, Hungary.

He later published his method, known as the Petrus system, on the Internet. It became a fairly popular method among intermediate and upper-level speedcubers, although its more recent use has diminished considerably due to the increased predominance of methods such as ZZ, Roux, and CFOP. Petrus won the 3x3x3 Fewest Moves category at the 2005 World Championships held in November 2005 at Lake Buena Vista, Florida, USA claiming the US$500 prize. He competed in the 2006 International Rubik's Cube Competition in San Francisco. He currently (since 1995) resides in SF Bay Area, California, USA, where he works as a software developer.

He also has catalogues and published an explanation of Ikea product names.

== The Lars Petrus System ==
The Petrus System was designed as an alternative to the popular layer-based solutions of the early 1980s using 2×2×2 blocks. Petrus reasoned that as a solver constructs layers, further organization of the cube's remaining pieces is restricted by what one has already done. In order for a layer-based solution to continue after the first layer had been constructed, the solved portion of the cube would have to be temporarily disassembled while the desired moves were made, then reassembled afterward. Petrus sought to get around this by solving the cube outwards from one corner, leaving unrestricted movement on several sides of the cube as the solve progresses. This method is often used to solve the cube in minimal moves.

=== The method ===
The system uses seven basic steps to solve a Rubik's Cube:

1. Build a 2×2×2 block
2. Expand to a 2×2×3 without altering the 2×2×2 block
3. Correct edge orientation (EO)
4. Solve two complete layers
5. Permute the remaining corners (CP)
6. Orient the remaining corners (CO)
7. Permute the final edges (EP)

Petrus invented three simple and flexible algorithms to complete the last three steps, which he named Niklas, Sune, and Allan.

While the method stands alone as an efficient system for solving the Rubik's Cube, many modifications have been made over the years to stay on the cutting edge of competitive speedcubing. Many more algorithms have been added to shave seconds off the solution time, and steps 5 and 6 or steps 6 and 7 are often combined depending on the problems each case presents.
