= Ontario Science Centre =

Science museum in Toronto, Ontario

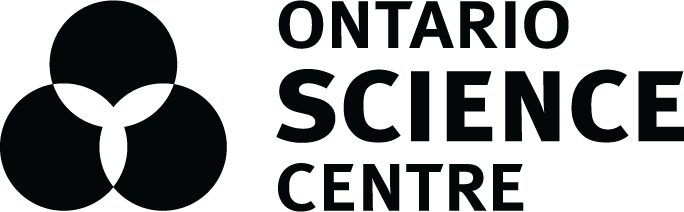
- Ontario Science Centre Logo

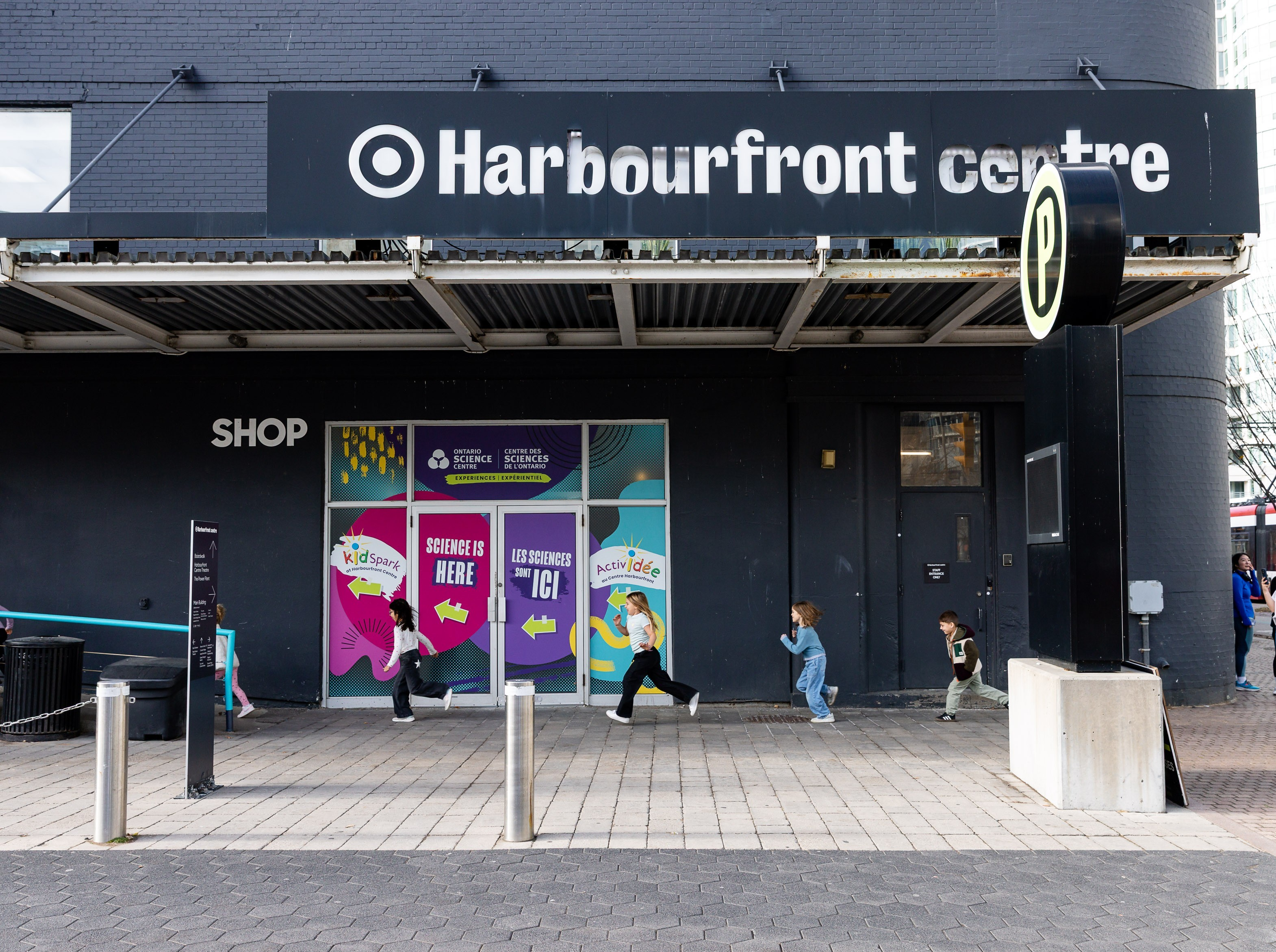
- Ontario Science Centre at Harbourfront Centre

- Location of the Ontario Science Centre in Toronto
- Former name: Centennial Museum of Science and Technology
- Established: September 26, 1969; 57 years ago
- Location: Harbourfront Centre, 235 Queens Quay West; Toronto, Ontario, Canada; M5J 2G8
- Coordinates: 43°38′19.8″N 79°22′57.8″W
- Type: Science centre
- Accreditation: Association of Science and Technology Centers (ASTC)
- Visitors: 900,225
- CEO: Paul Kortenaar
- Chairperson: John Carmichael
- Architect: Raymond Moriyama
- Owner: Government of Ontario
- Public transit access: Toronto Transit Commission
- Parking: Paid parking on site
- Website: www.ontariosciencecentre.ca

The Ontario Science Centre, originally the Centennial Centre of Science and Technology, is a science museum and educational organization temporarily located at Harbourfront Centre in Toronto, Canada.

== Site ==
The original site, located near the Don Valley Parkway on Don Mills Road in the former city of North York, is about 11 kilometres (6.8 mi) northeast of downtown Toronto. Built into the side of a ravine formed by a branch of the Don River, the museum consisted of a series of buildings constructed at different levels on a steep hill and connected by escalators. Large windows provided views of the surrounding forest and river. It was closed by the Government of Ontario in June 2024 after an engineering report identified a high risk of roof collapse. The closure and relocation plans drew public opposition.

In 2023, Ontario Premier Doug Ford announced a government plan to relocate the Ontario Science Centre to a new, smaller building at Ontario Place on the Toronto waterfront.

The Ontario Science Centre opened KidSpark at Harbourfront Centre in 2024. Harbourfront Centre serves as its interim home—with an expansion planned for Summer 2026—offering interactive exhibits until the Ontario Place site is ready. Premier Doug Ford has announced in May 2026 that they have broken ground on the new site and are committed to opening in 2029.

== History ==
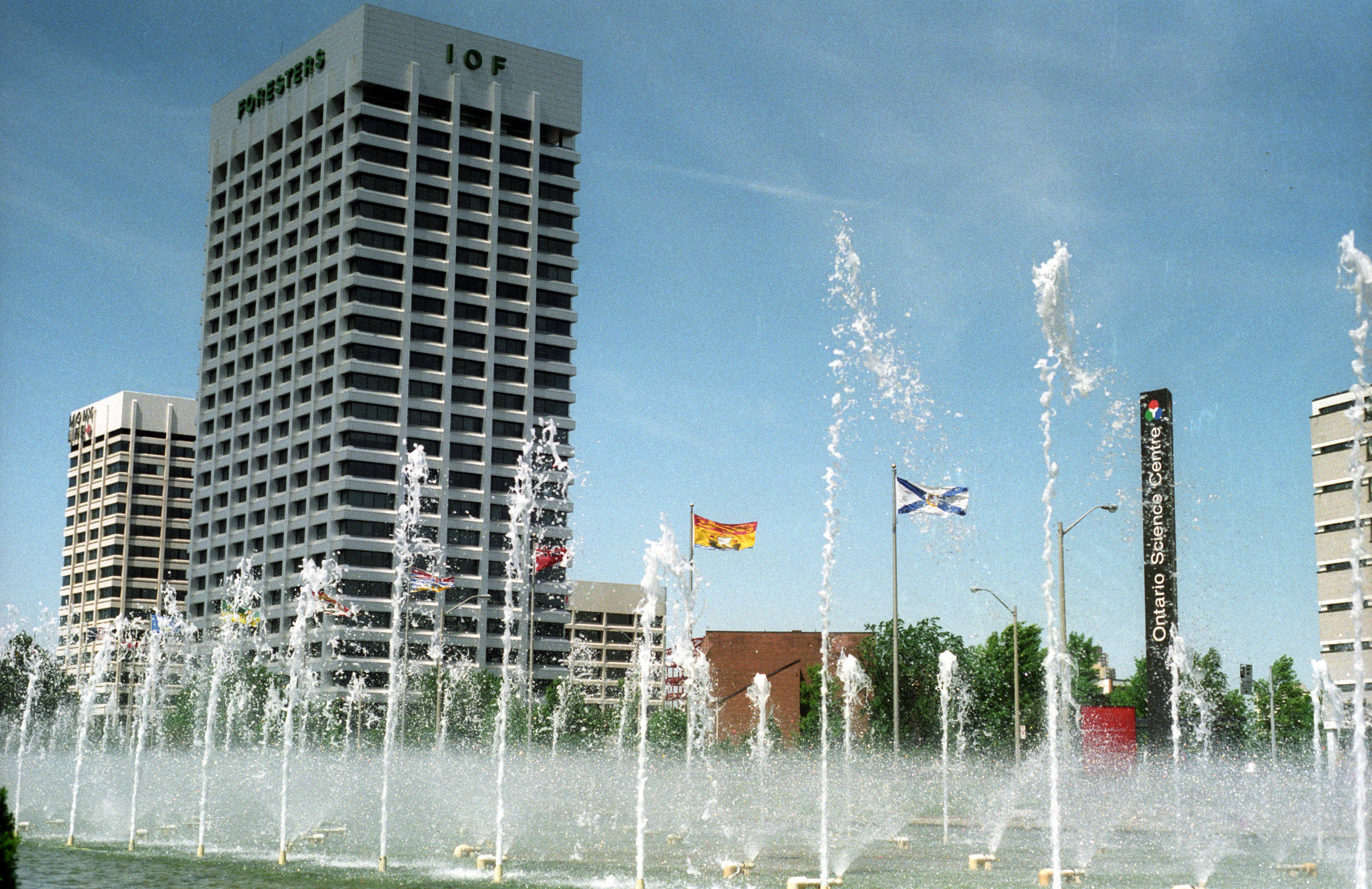
Original fountains of the Centre in 1992. Replaced in 2006 by Teluscape plaza

=== Construction and opening ===
Planning for the Science Centre began in 1961 during Toronto's expansion in the late 1950s and 1960s. In August 1964, Ontario Premier John Robarts announced the creation of the Centennial Centre of Science and Technology as a Centennial Project. Toronto architect Raymond Moriyama was hired to design the site.

Construction started in 1966 with plans to open the Centennial Centre of Science and Technology as part of the Canadian Centennial celebrations in 1967. However, construction was not completed by 1967, and the Science Centre did not open to the public until two years later, on 26 September 1969. The final cost of the project was CA$30,000,000 (equivalent to $250,050,761 in 2025).

The official opening was held on the morning of 27 September and attended by a small group of guests, followed by an opening to a larger group of 30,000 guests in the early afternoon. It then opened to the general public on 28 September, drawing 9,000 visitors. Its advertising slogan at launch was "Come see what would happen if Albert Einstein and Walt Disney had gotten together."

Upon opening in 1969, the Science Centre claimed to have adopted a hands-on approach to science, aligning with the interactive educational philosophy seen at institutions such as San Francisco's Exploratorium (1969) and the Michigan Science Center (1970) in Detroit.

The original exhibits included a simulation of the LEM landing on the Moon, a tic-tac-toe game played against a computer, and a simulated hot cell. The museum also had an outreach program, which included touring vans that visited schools around the province.

The majority of the exhibits at the Science Centre were interactive, while others were live demonstrations, such as metalworking. The communications room contained many computerized displays, including a tic-tac-toe game, run on a PDP-11 minicomputer. By 1974, the OSC hosted around 250,000 students on field trips annually.

=== Operations from 1990 to 2022 ===
==== International contract (1990) ====
In 1990, the Ontario Science Centre announced a contract with Oman to design a children's museum. At the time, the Centre had agreed to boycott Israeli goods and services while under contract. The agreement was later amended to specify that all goods sold to Oman would be produced in North America. The Centre's director-general, Mark Abbott, was subsequently dismissed for signing the original contract.

In 1996, a redesigned entryway was opened, which contained an Omnimax theatre. Beginning in 2001, a redesign funded by a mix of public and private capital began. It was completed in 2007.

==== Renewal: Agents of Change (2001–2007) ====
Beginning in 2001, the Science Centre launched a major renewal initiative known as Agents of Change, to modernize its facilities and programming. The project renovated approximately 85 per cent of the Centre's public space and created seven new experience areas. Funding for the initiative totaled $47.5 million and included contributions from the Government of Ontario, private-sector companies, and individual donors.

On August 23–24, 2003, the 2003 Rubik's Cube World Championship was held and was the first Rubik's cube competition to be held since 1982.

The Agents of Change transformation was completed in 2007, marked by the opening of the Weston Family Innovation Centre and the TELUSCAPE plaza.

==== COVID-19 outreach (2020) ====
During the COVID-19 pandemic, the Science Centre received $500,000 from the Government of Canada to support efforts promoting COVID-19 vaccine uptake among children and their families.

=== Facility decay, replacement plans, and closure ===
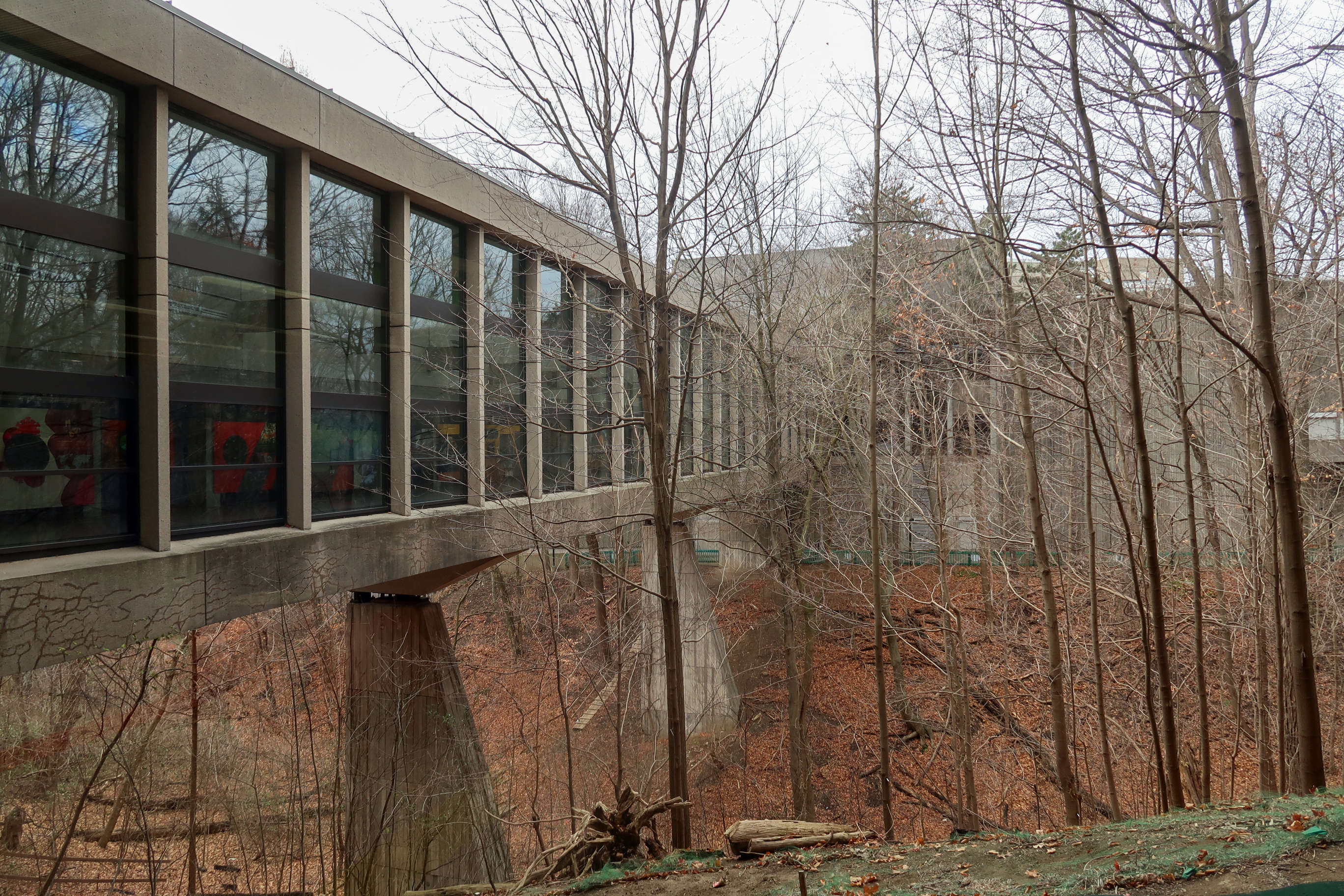
The pedestrian bridge leading to the museum's sixth level was closed in 2023 because of structural decay.

From 2023 until the Don Mills site's closure, a shuttle bus ran from the Science Centre's entrance to the main exhibit area on the museum's Level 6, because of structural decay in the pedestrian bridge that led to the exhibit area, located at the bottom of the Don River ravine.

On 18 April 2023, Ontario Premier Doug Ford announced the provincial government's plan to relocate the Science Centre to a new facility on the grounds of Ontario Place on the Toronto waterfront. This announcement drew public criticism due to concerns about potential downsizing and exhibit losses. Both the Architectural Conservancy of Ontario and the Toronto Society of Architects condemned the relocation plans, while the grassroots group Save Ontario's Science Centre organized rallies and campaigns to oppose the government's decision. Toronto City Council also sought to keep the Science Centre at its original location.

In December 2023, the Auditor General of Ontario concluded that the government's decision "was not fully informed and based on preliminary and incomplete costing information, and had proceeded without full consultation from key stakeholders or a clear plan for the existing site".

On 21 June 2024, the Ministry of Infrastructure announced the immediate closure of the Don Mills location, citing an engineering report revealing water damage affecting two to six per cent of the building's roofs. The report estimated that repairs would cost at least $22 million and take two years to complete. Safety concerns about the roof material in question, reinforced autoclaved aerated concrete (RAAC), had caused the temporary or permanent closure of hundreds of buildings in the United Kingdom in 2023. While roughly 400 public buildings in Ontario contain RAAC, the Science Centre is currently the only one in the province closed over these concerns.

The Ford government expedited its plan to relocate the Science Centre to the waterfront, targeting a 2028 opening, and later revised to 2029, with a temporary location slated for January 2026. This decision drew criticism from Moriyama Teshima Architects, the firm founded by the Science Centre's original architect.

The architects offered pro bono design consulting services for the Government of Ontario to support immediate repairs to the roof, and called for other organizations to join the effort to facilitate repairs. Private donors, including computer scientist Geoffrey Hinton, offered up to $1 million to fund repairs for the existing facility, but the province did not respond to these offers.

==== Disputes over closure rationale ====
In May 2025, the Canadian Architect magazine obtained the drafts of the structural report done by the Rimkus Consulting Group. Dated to the spring of 2024, the drafts recommended routine repairs of the roof with a strong emphasis on RAAC panel replacement, a straightforward project that had already been put into effect for the most critical panels. Although there was mention of "full closure" in the final report, restricted access would only be needed for a "minuscule portion" of the high-risk roof areas. The report drafts are considered alongside a 2024 Global News story that highlighted frequent communication between Rimkus and Infrastructure Ontario before the report's official submission. Critics argued that the "supplemental risk mitigation options" were only inserted in response to political pressure. The suggestion of restricted access and the potential consequences of preventing repairs appear to be the primary justifications for a full closure of the centre.

==== Temporary locations and future of original site ====
By 31 October 2024, most of the exhibits had been moved to storage facilities in northern Toronto and Guelph, while the animals and plants had been transferred to the Toronto Zoo in the eastern part of Scarborough and The Village at Black Creek in the western part of North York. Temporary pop-up exhibits have since opened at Sherway Gardens in the southern part of Etobicoke and Toronto's Harbourfront Centre by the Toronto waterfront.

In December 2024, the Auditor General (AG) of Ontario questioned the financial prudence of the relocation. Contrary to the Ford government's business plan analysis, which projected $257 million in savings over 50 years, the AG found that relocation costs have already exceeded the anticipated savings, reaching approximately $400 million.

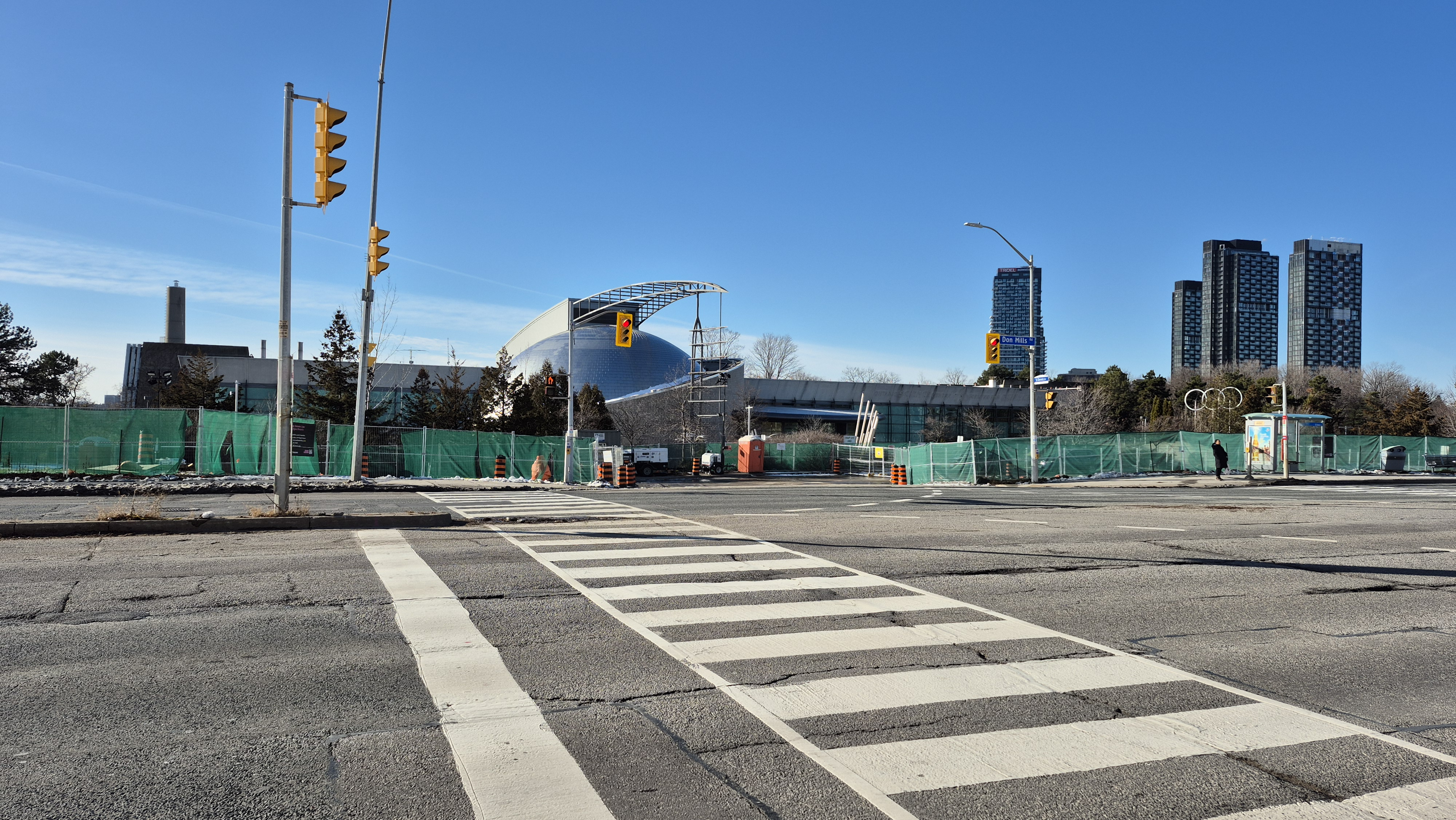
Ontario Science Centre as of 24 December 2025, with signage removed from the building and the digital sign and flagpoles taken down. The area around it has been undergoing heavy development for the Ontario Line.

As of 2025, the area around the Science Centre is being developed for the upcoming Ontario Line, which will pass nearby in an overhead track. Deforestation and land development work have been occurring at the site. The station for the line and for Line 5 Eglinton that were originally to be known as "Science Centre station" have been renamed to "Don Valley Station". Security presence, as well as construction and repairs on the roof of the building have also been noticed, though Infrastructure Ontario stated that direct roof access for snow removal was "unsafe" following record snowfalls in January 2026. All of this continues with no clear plan from the province for what will become of the original building.

Following that heavy snowfall in January 2026, renewed calls to reopen or find an alternative use for the building occurred, with continued opposition from the government of Ontario. This followed previous reports that continued maintenance work was occurring at the building and plans for a temporary site at the Harbourfront Centre. No confirmed usage for the original building has been announced as of 2026. In February 2026, Premier Ford unveiled the designs of the new building and announced that a contract had been awarded for its construction. It will cost an estimated $1 billion and will be smaller than the original facility, with an area of about 400,000 square feet (37,000 m^{2}).

== Original grounds ==
=== Building ===
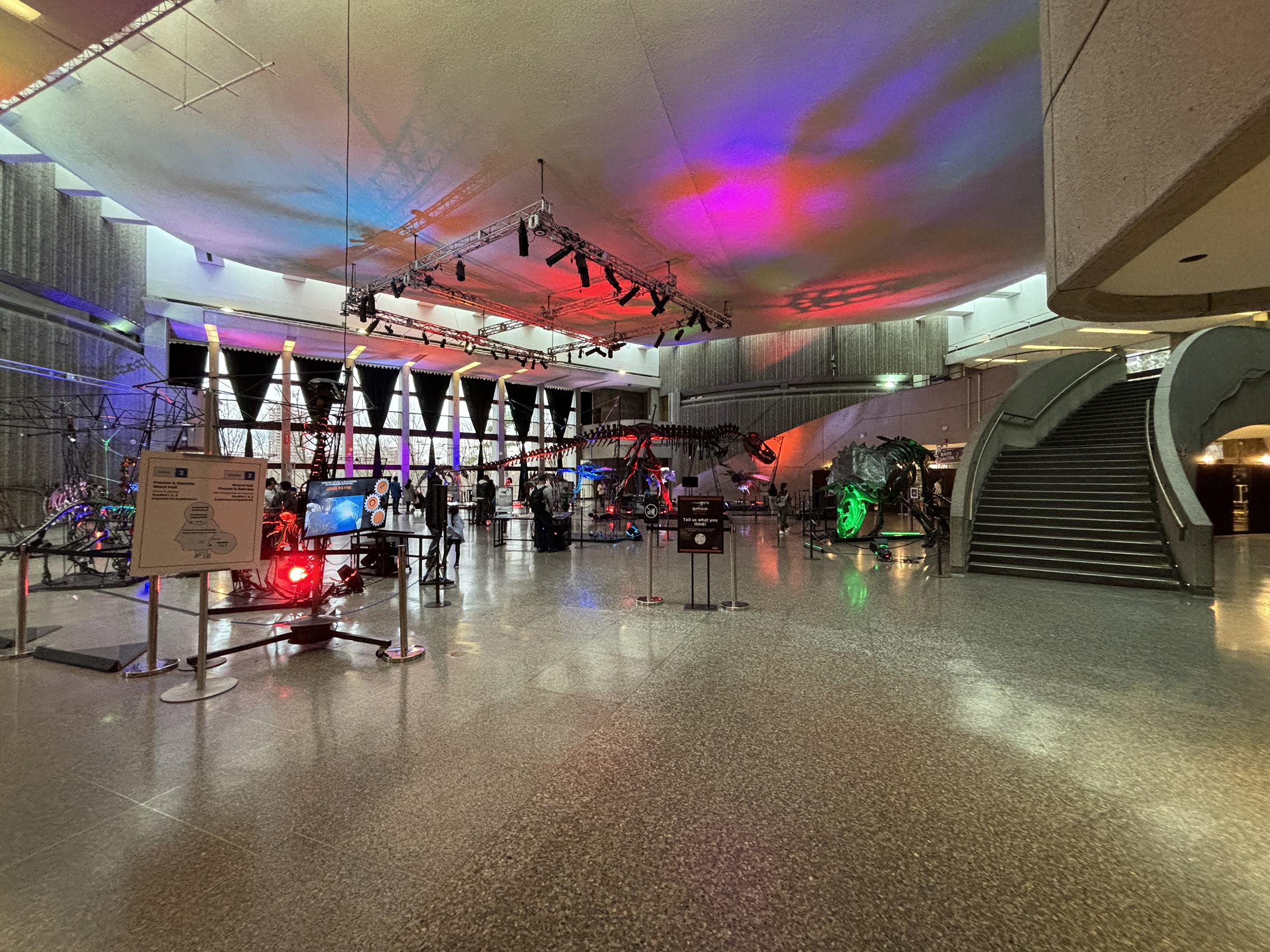
Procter & Gamble Great Hall

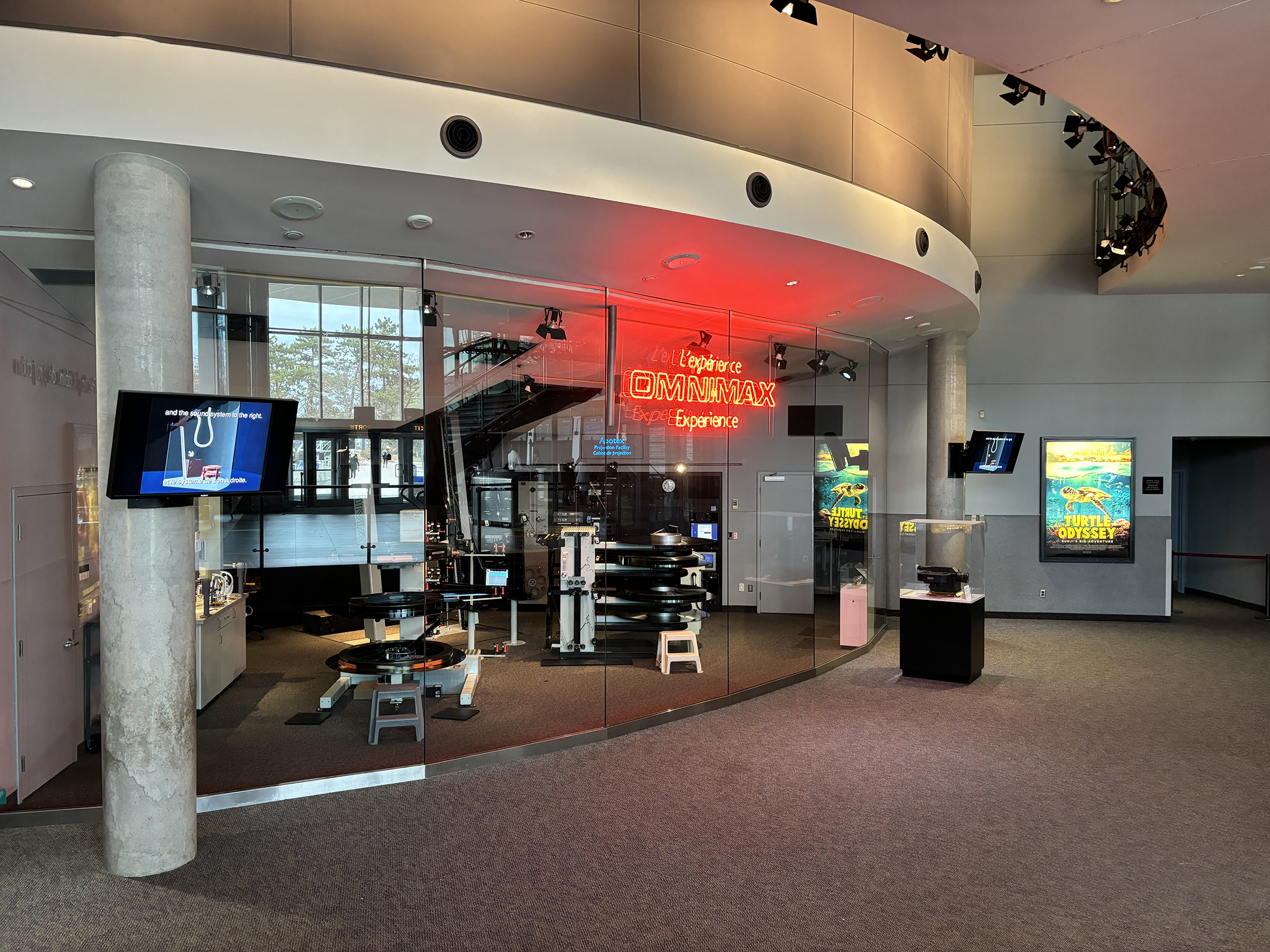
OMNIMAX Theatre Entrance

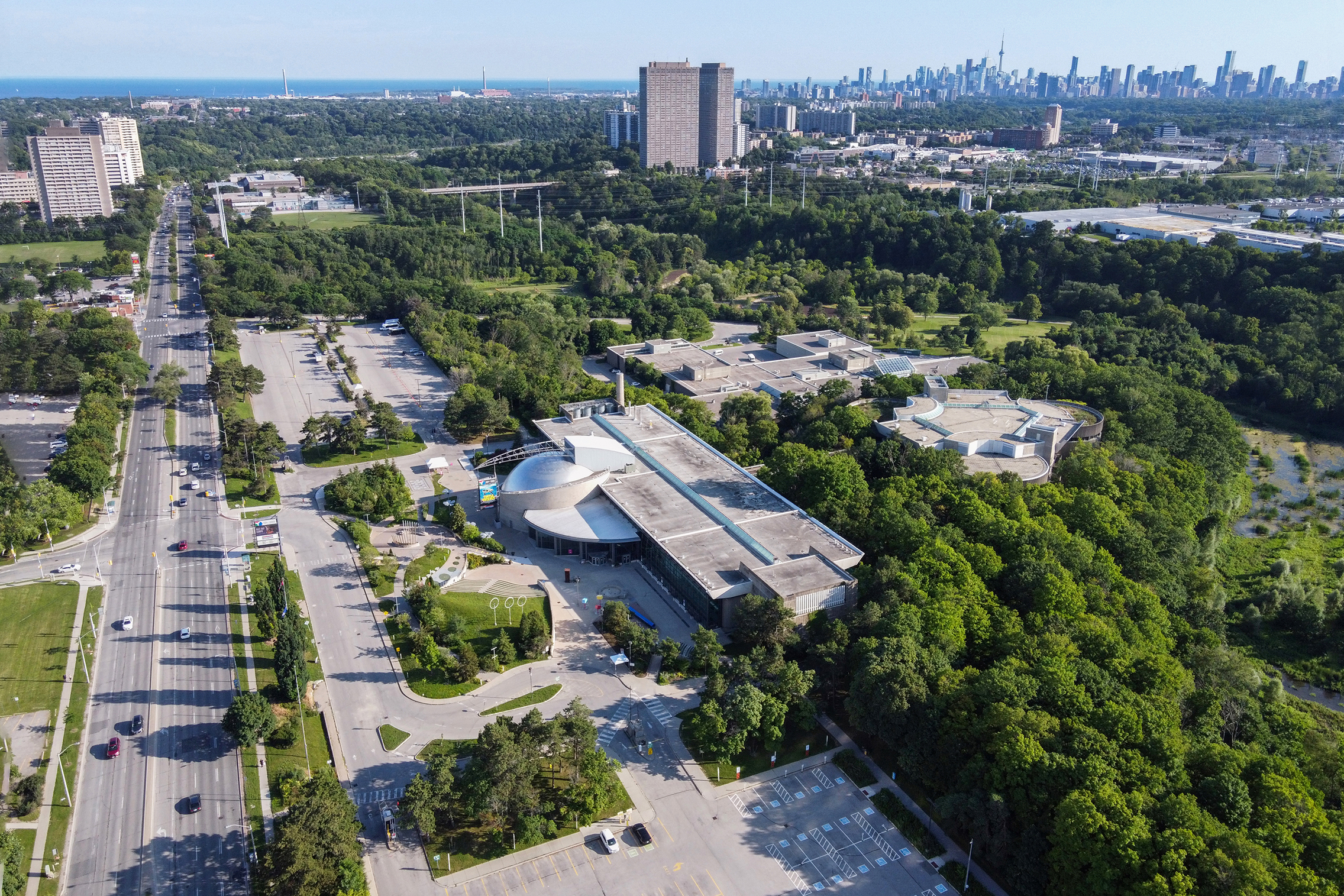
Aerial view of the building in 2023

Designed in the early 1960s, the original buildings were built in the Brutalist architectural style. The building complex is made up of three main buildings connected by a series of bridges and escalators set within more than 40 hectares (100 acres) of parkland. The buildings were constructed while avoiding removal or damage to the mature trees in the area, so that "the buildings seem to fit naturally into their environment". They follow the natural contours of the Don River ravine, into which the Centre descends. Ontario's only IMAX Dome theatre opened in 1996.

The Great Hall is an event venue at the Ontario Science Centre and is home to Cloud, a large, computer-controlled kinetic sculpture by Toronto installation artist David Rokeby, which consists of an array of blue and transparent squares that rotate in various ways to simulate the three states of matter: solid, liquid and gas.

For much of its history, the Science Centre has hosted a demonstration amateur radio station. Formerly located in the Hall of Space, the station was later relocated to Level 4 of the Centre, next to the elevator. The station has the call sign "VE3OSC", and licensed amateur radio operators volunteer there daily from 10 a.m. to 3 p.m.

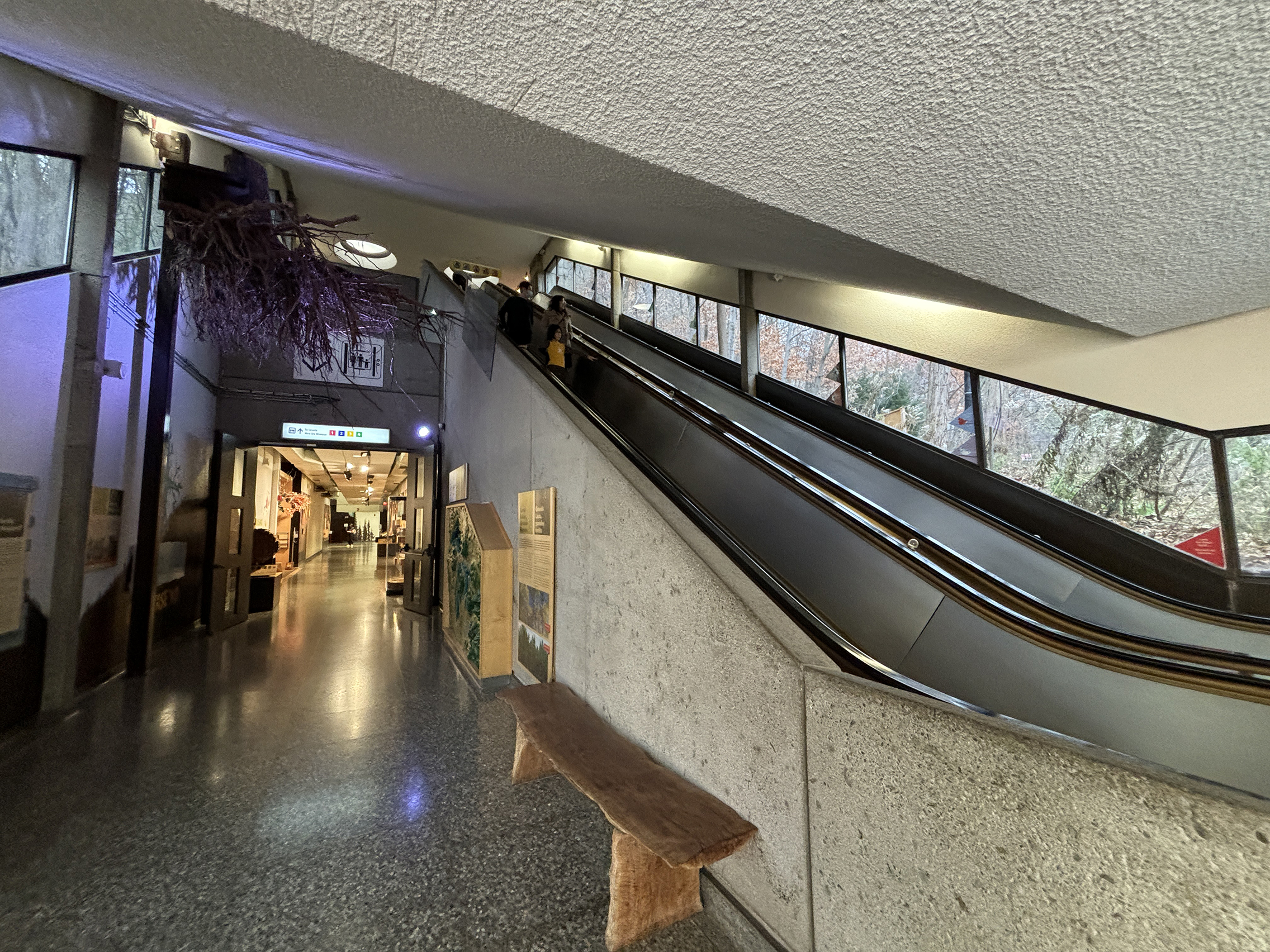
Buildings connected by escalator

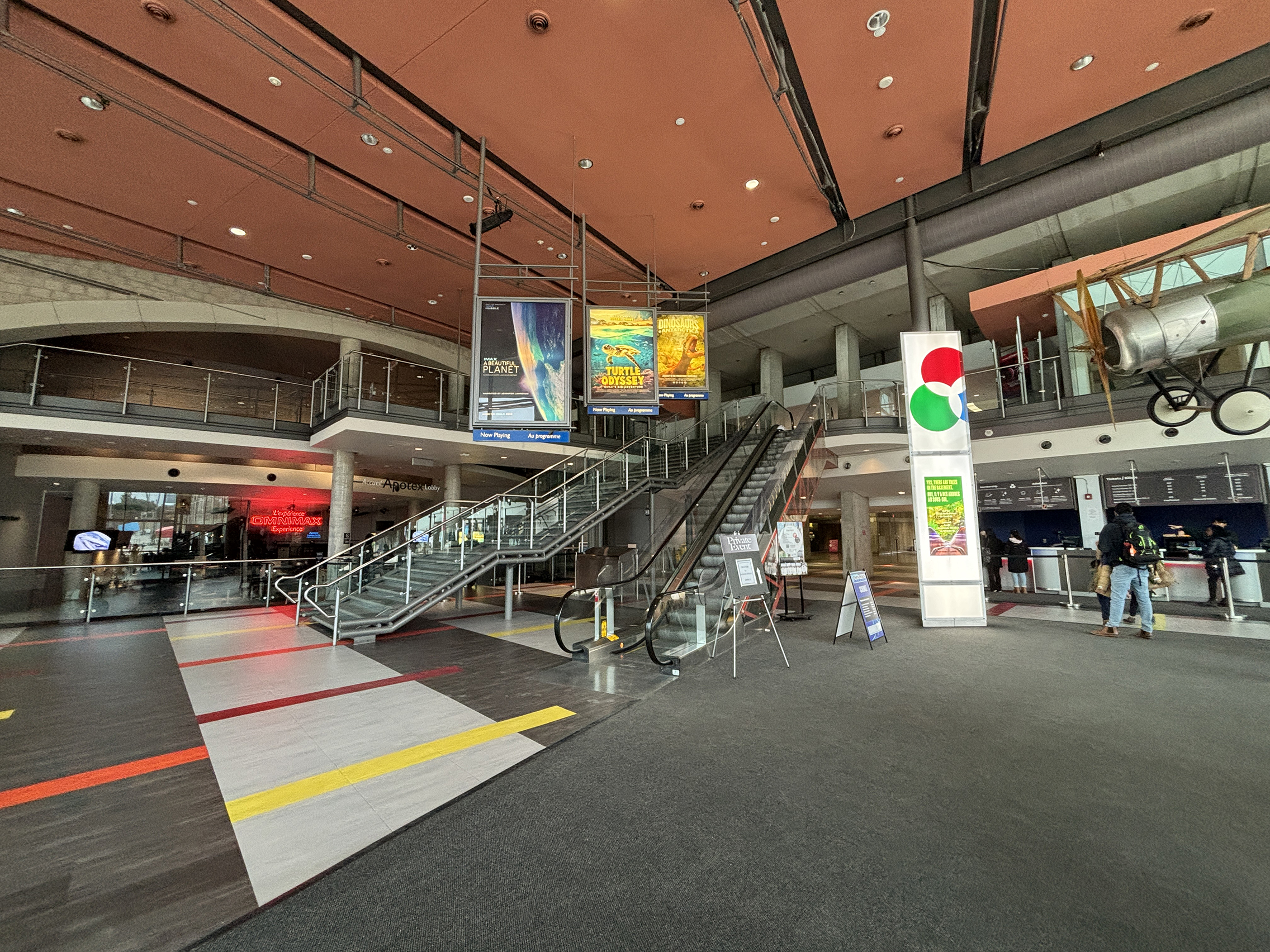
Front entrance lobby

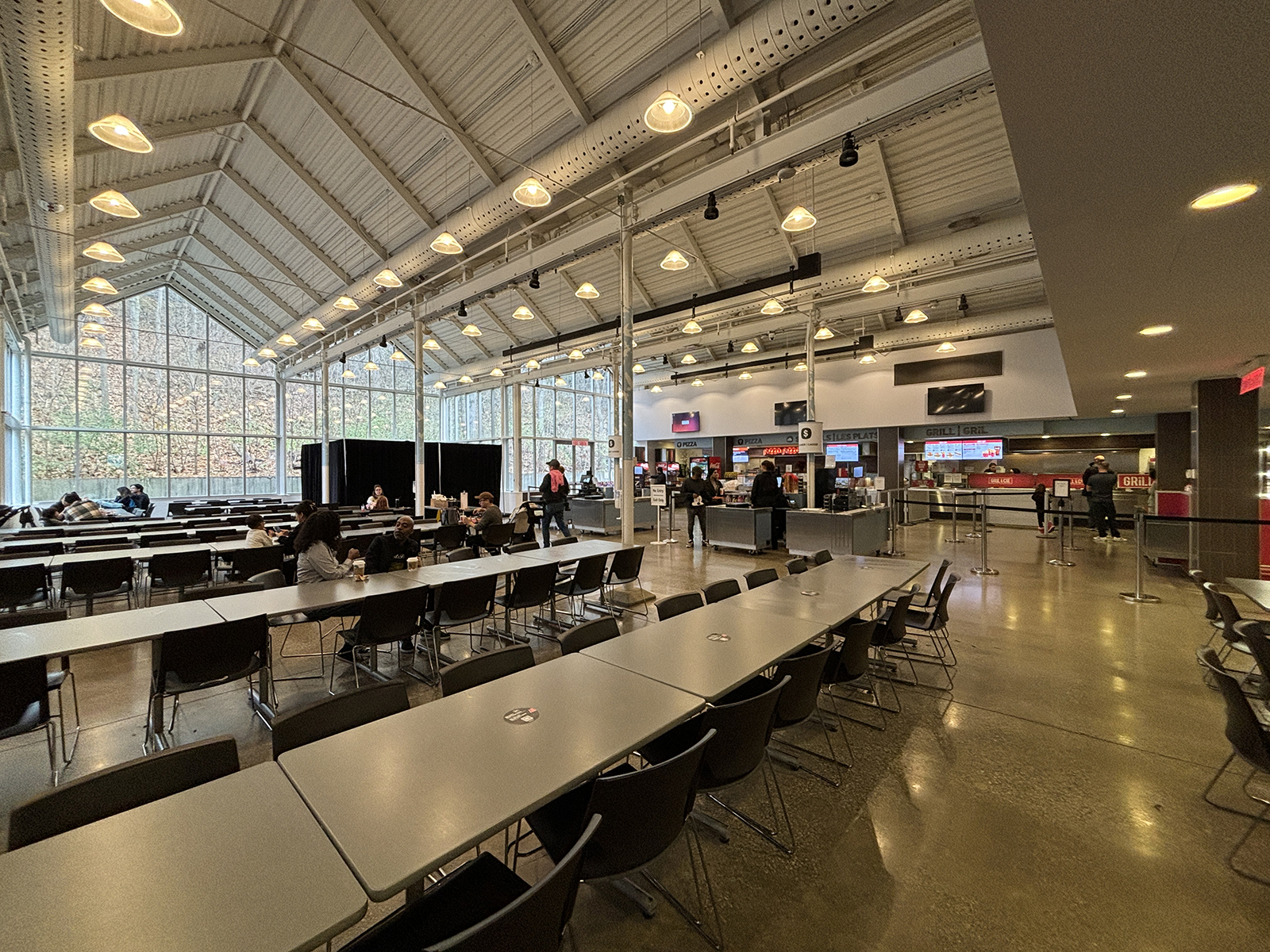
Valley Restaurant with large windows

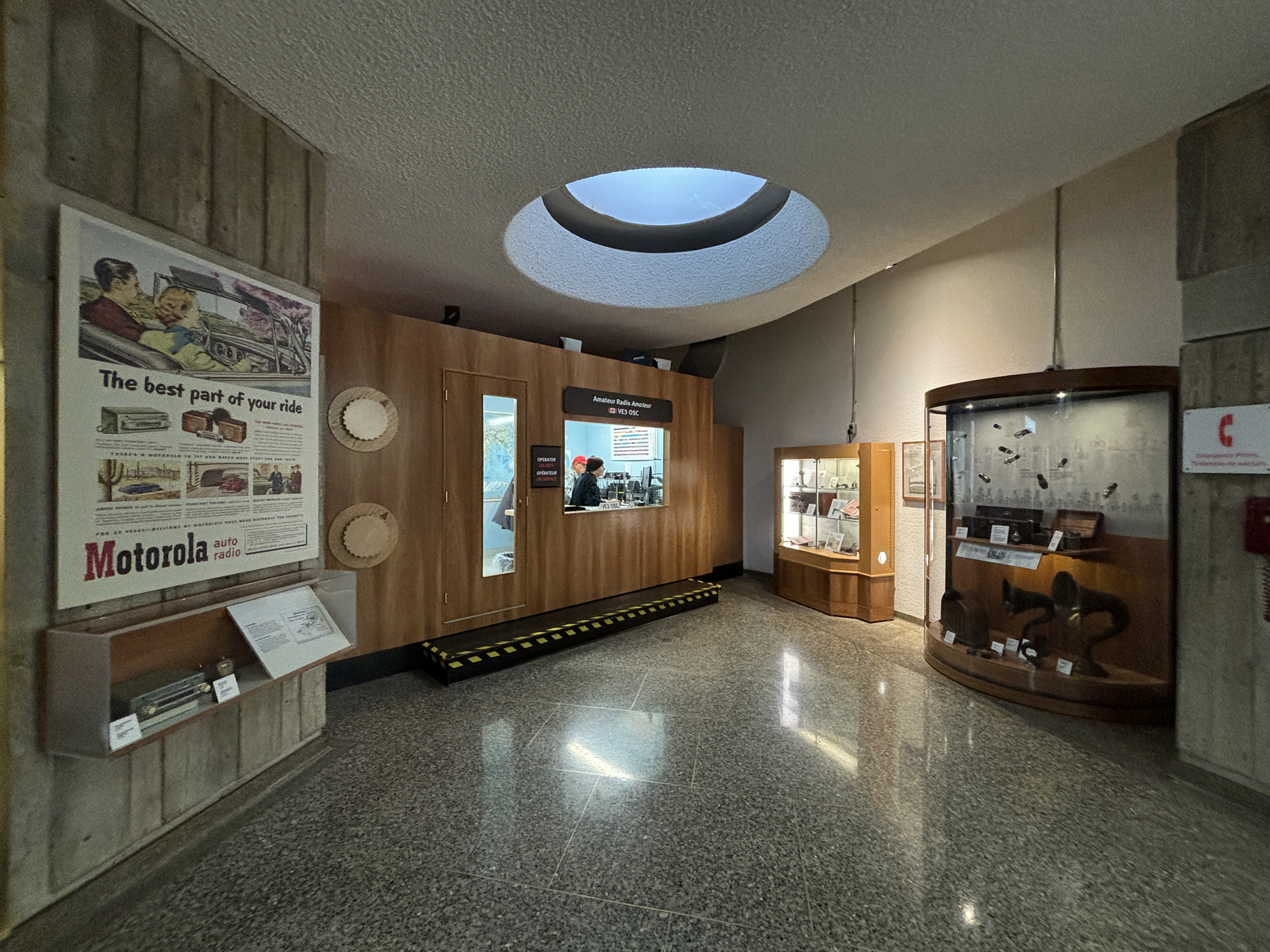
Amateur radio in level 3

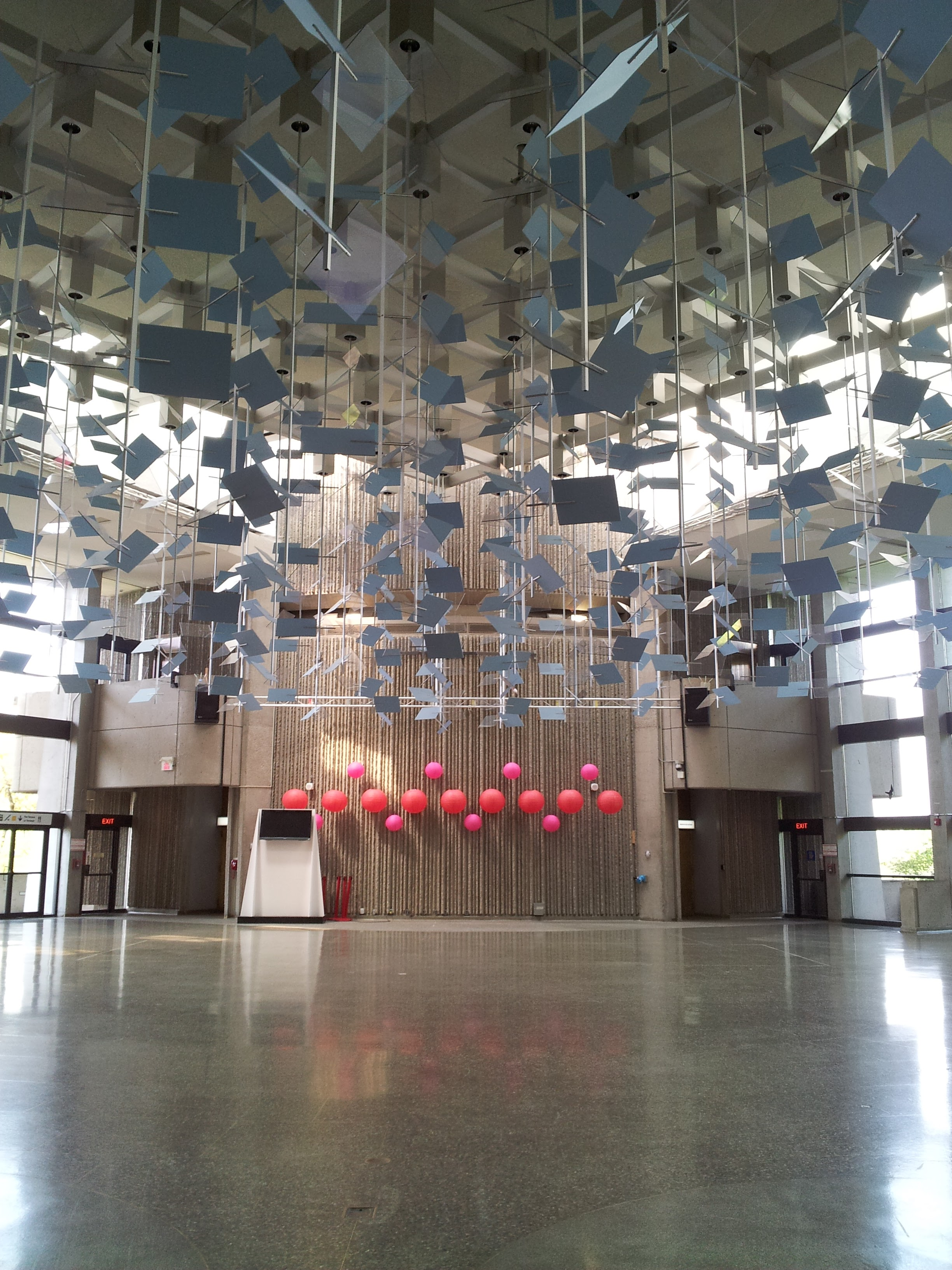
The Great Hall enclosed Cloud, a kinetic sculpture by David Rokeby; this installation has been removed.

=== Plaza ===
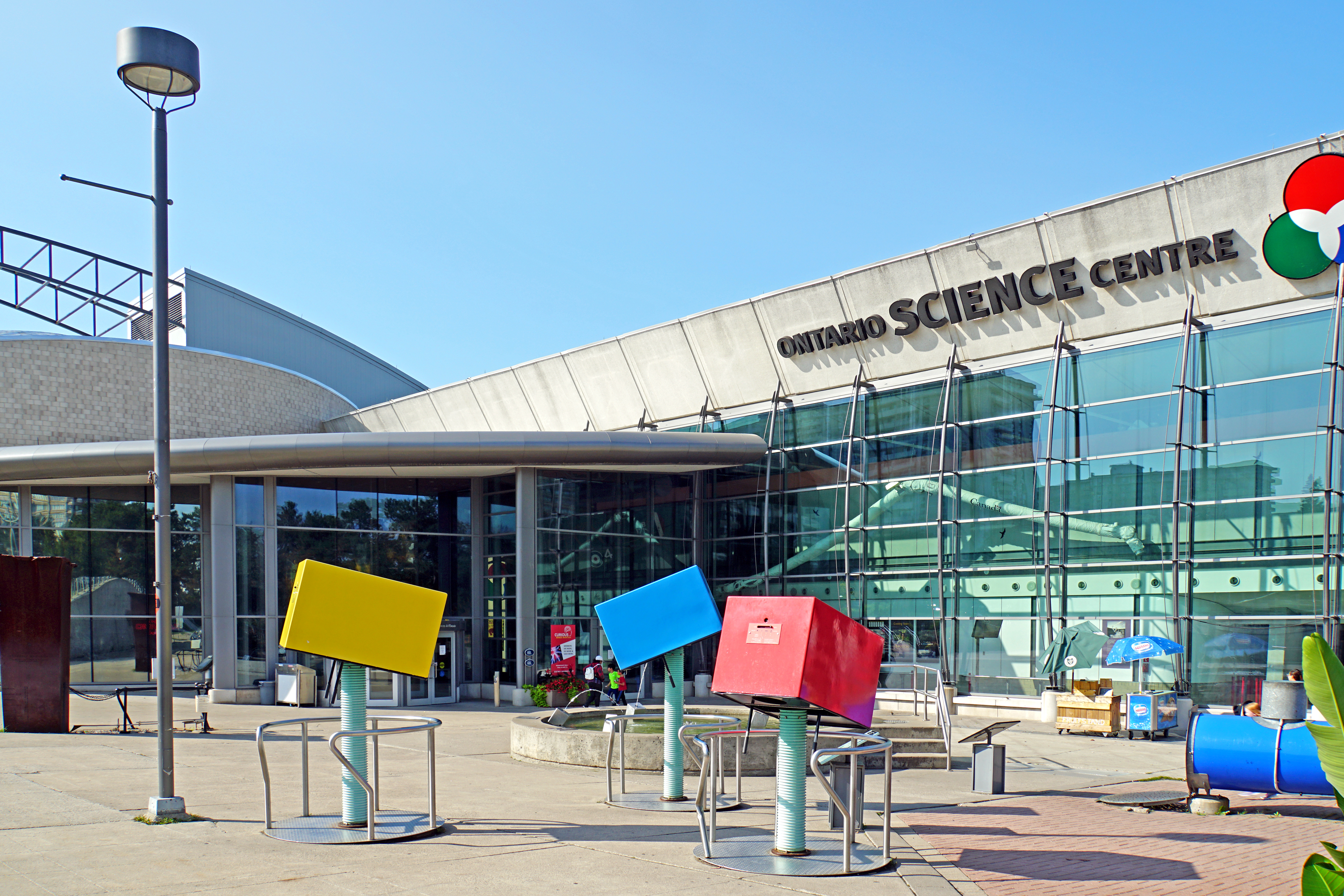
Named after telecom company Telus, Teluscape, an outdoor plaza next to the main entrance with interactive exhibits

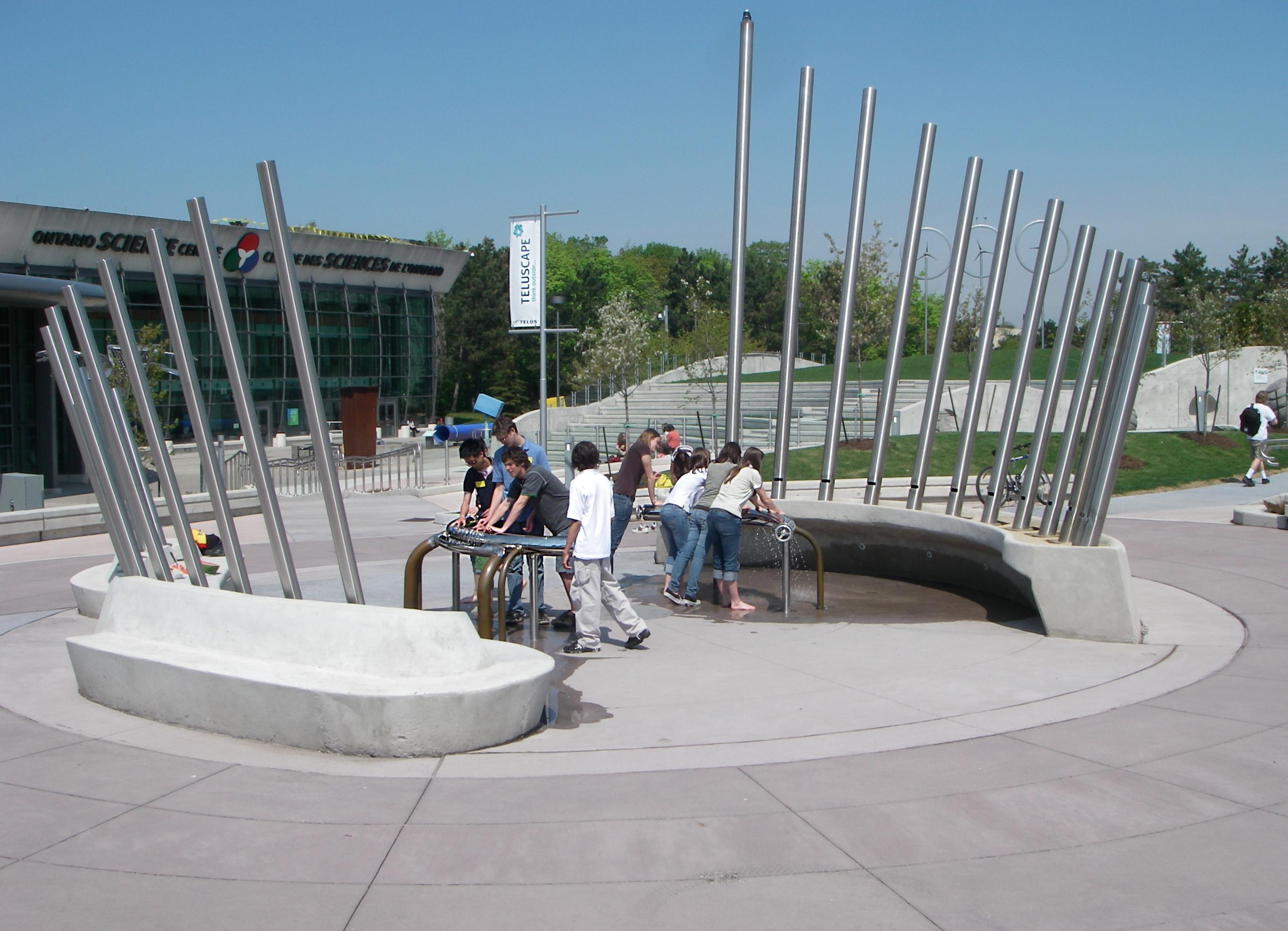
Hydraulophone, located on the plaza in front of the museum

Lotic Meander by Stacy Levy is an outdoor installation in polished and blasted granite and cast glass set into the solar terrace of the Ontario Science Centre. The work depicts the patterns of water as it moves through a streambed. In 2007, the Ontario Science Centre opened the Teluscape Exploration Plaza, which featured several interactive exhibits adjacent to the science centre's exterior main entrance and is named after telecom company Telus.

When the Ontario Science Centre first opened, a large fountain sat directly in front of the main entrance. It was designed to function as a traffic roundabout, partially obscuring the building from the street while also helping to cool it.

That area was later reworked to create a more open and welcoming entrance. At the centre of the plaza is what has been described as the world's largest outdoor hydraulophone, designed by installation artist Steve Mann. This water-powered musical instrument was intended to be played by anyone passing through the space.

== Closure of the Don Mills location ==
On 21 June 2024, the Ontario provincial government announced the immediate closure of the Don Mills Road location, citing an engineering report by Rimkus Consulting Group that found roof panels made of reinforced autoclaved aerated concrete (RAAC) posed a risk of collapse under snow load by October 2024. The closure was announced with only a few hours' notice, drawing criticism from opposition parties, advocacy groups, and the architectural firm that designed the original building. Over 95,000 people signed a petition demanding the building be repaired and reopened at its original location. As of 2026, the province operates a temporary KidSpark exhibit at Harbourfront Centre, with a larger interim location expected to open in summer 2026. A permanent new facility at Ontario Place is projected to open in 2029 at an estimated cost of $1.4 billion, following construction delays and cost increases of nearly $400 million above the original estimate, and would incorporate some of the original structures there, such as the Cinesphere and the pods.

== Exhibitions at the Don Mills site ==
=== Traveling exhibits ===
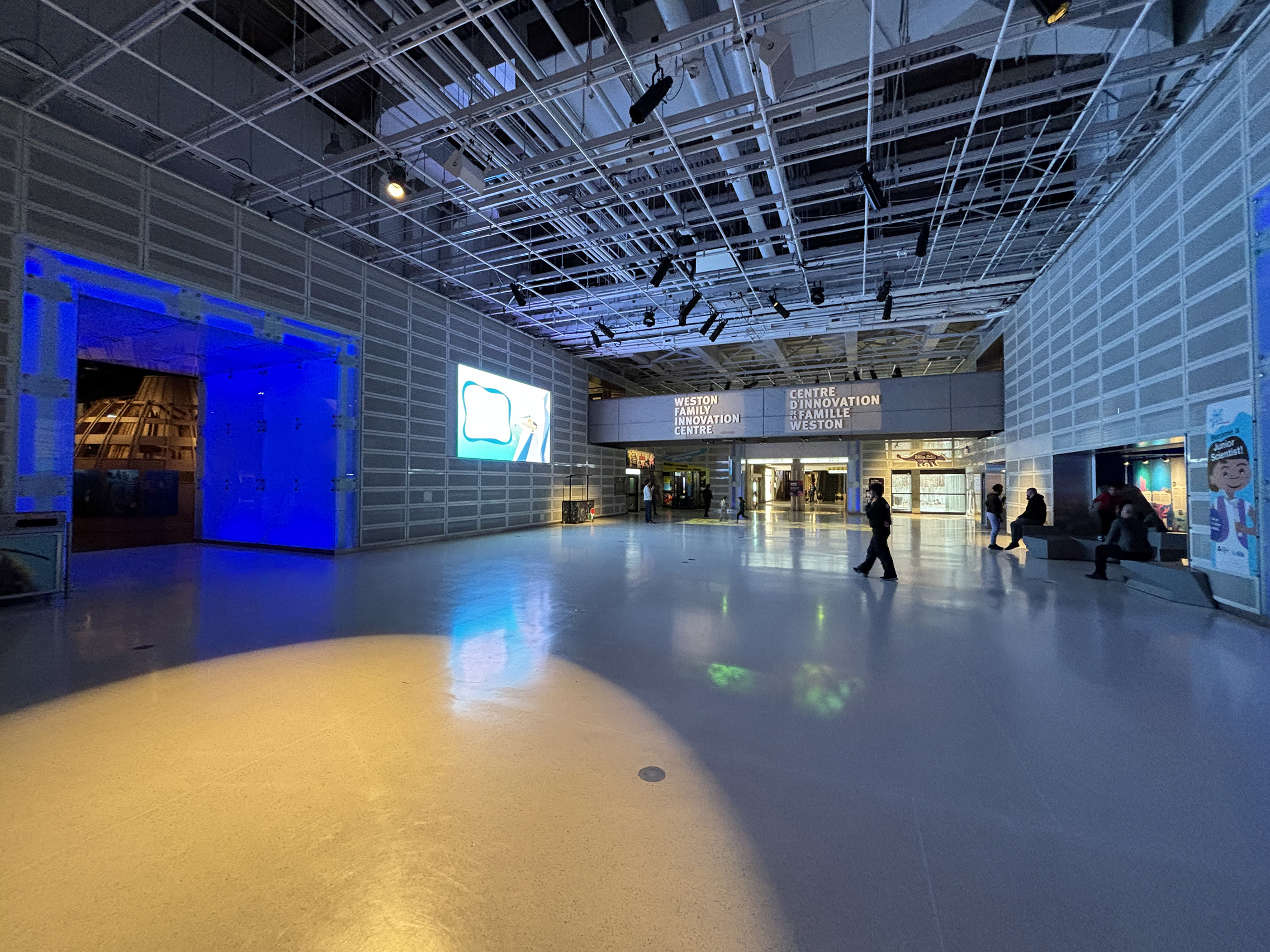
Ontario Science Centre Level 6 Hot Zone

The Science Centre has hosted many traveling exhibits since its opening. In 1982, the exhibition China: 7,000 Years of Discovery broke all known attendance records and attracted more than 1.5 million visitors.

In 2003, the Strange Matter exhibition opened, and the Body Worlds 2 exhibition attracted almost half a million visitors over five months when it came to the Centre in 2005. The exhibition Facing Mars ran in 2008. The Centre hosted Harry Potter: The Exhibition, a collection of props from the film series in 2010. Leonardo da Vinci's Workshop (2011) featured physical models of da Vinci's inventions, built from drawings in his Codices. It also included interactive touch-screen digital reproductions of his Codices, the Mona Lisa and The Last Supper. Circus: The Exhibition ran in 2012. Game On 2.0, a video game history exhibition, ran 9 March to 2 September 2013.

In June 2014, the Centre welcomed The Science of Rock 'N' Roll, which explored how advances in science and technology have revolutionized music. The exhibition featured eight areas involving various interactive components, historical artifacts, informational walls, documentary videos, and more. The exhibition was followed by In Knowledge We Trust (4 October to 7 December 2014), which explored the role trust plays in making us willing to share or use the knowledge we receive.

During summer 2015, the Centre hosted MythBusters: The Explosive Exhibition, based on the popular television series MythBusters. On 4 June 2016, the Centre hosted a free non-ticketed one-day outdoor exhibit near the entrance promoting the handheld Nintendo 3DS video game Kirby: Planet Robobot, which also featured activities about the Kirby video game series and a visit by a performer in a full Kirby costume. In 2017, to celebrate the 150th anniversary of Canada, the Centre opened the exhibition Canada 150: Discovery Way, featuring Canadian stories behind transformational inventions and innovations.

=== Permanent galleries and exhibits ===
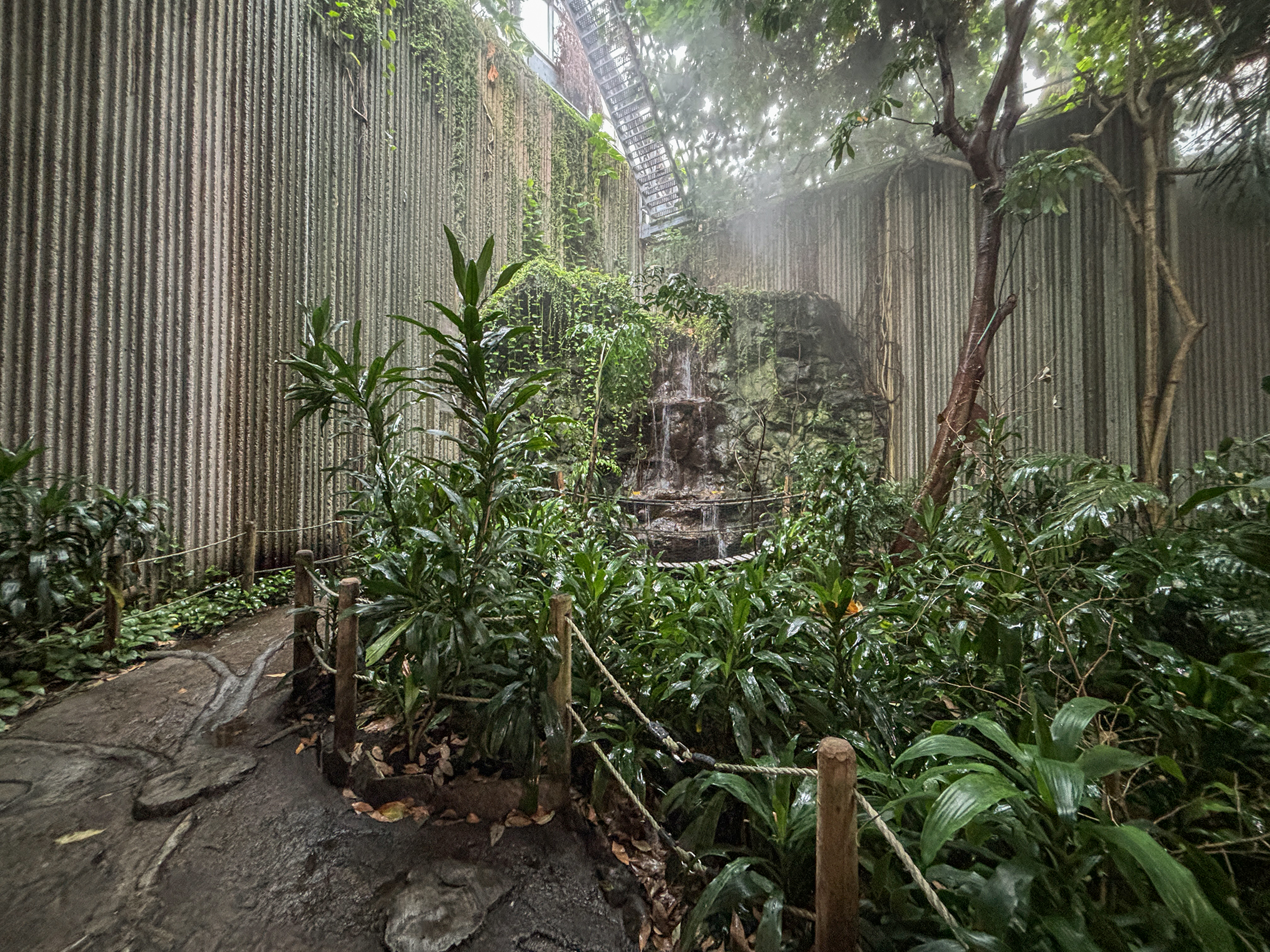
Simulated tropical rainforest

The science centre had several hundred interactive and passive permanent exhibits, featuring geology, the science of nature (in the west wing), astronomical science, how to play music and technology in the south wing, human anatomy, communication and bias, and some miscellaneous artifacts of science.

==== A Question of Truth ====
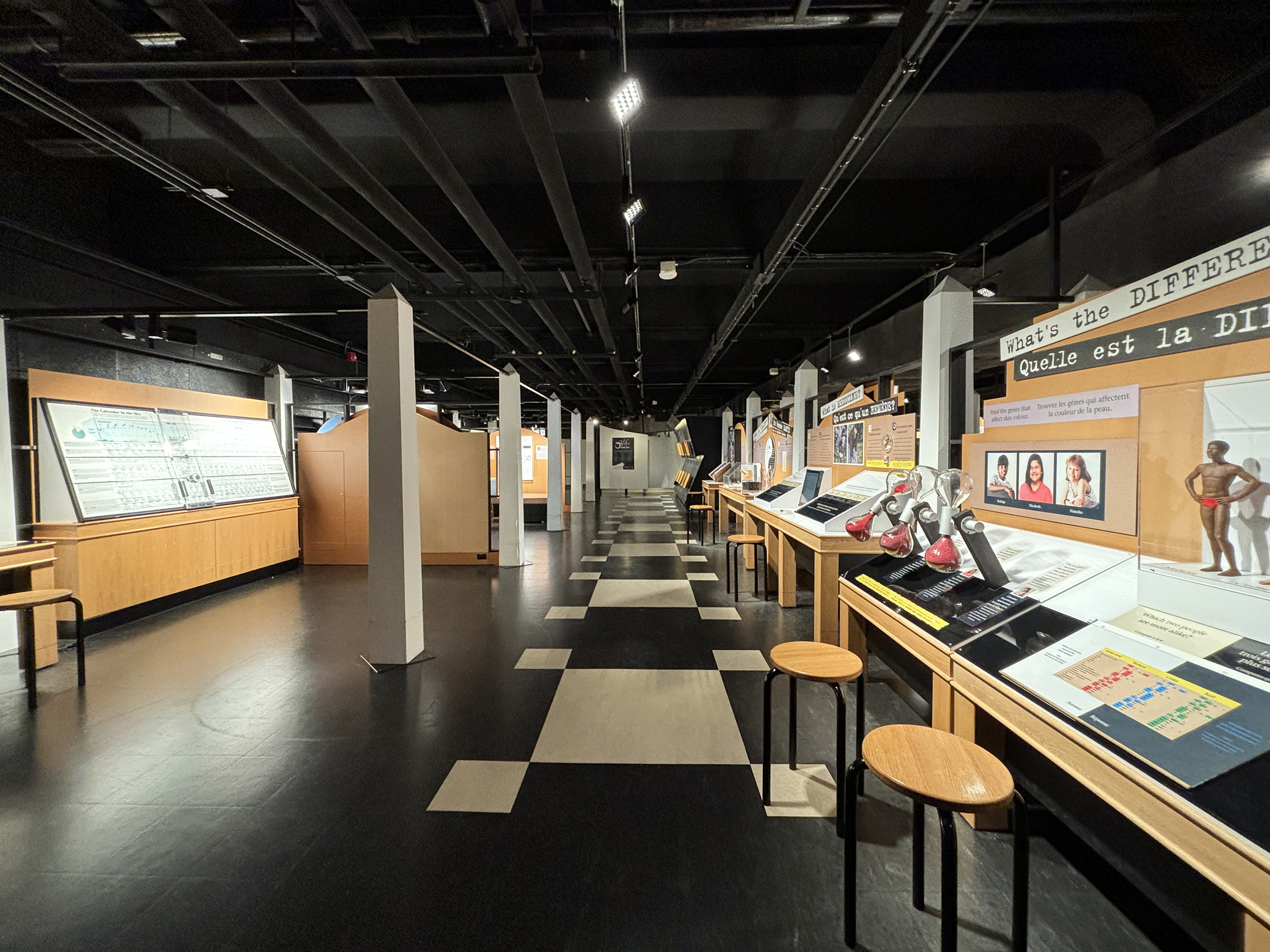
Level 5 A Question of Truth

A Question of Truth was an exhibit that explored the methodologies, biases, and beliefs of scientific research set up in 2000. The exhibit provided visitors with an opportunity to test controversial theories.

==== AstraZeneca Human Edge ====
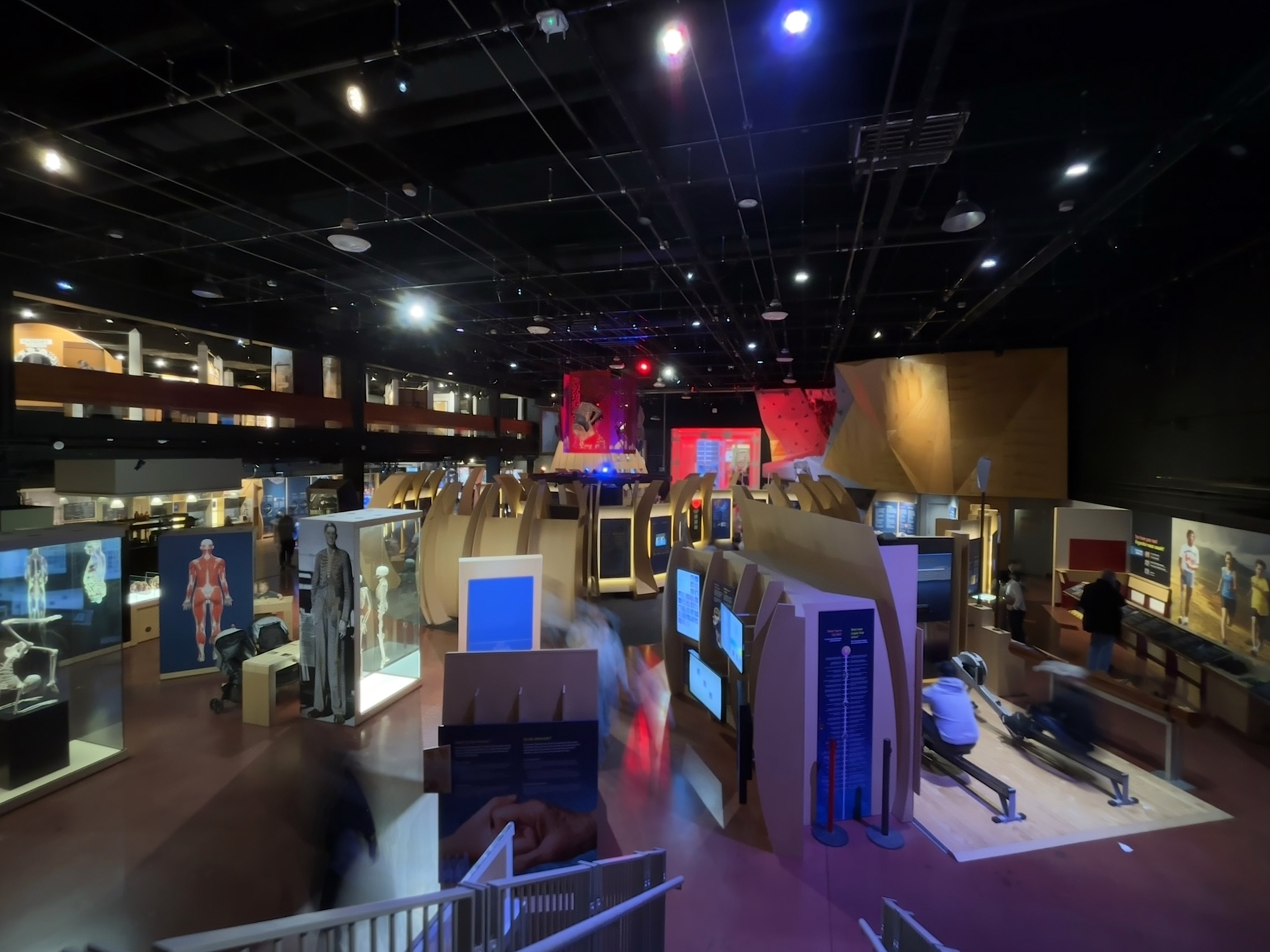
Level 6 AstraZeneca Human Edge

The AstraZeneca Human Edge replaced the original human anatomy gallery, opened in December 2013 with sponsorship from pharmaceutical and biotechnology company AstraZeneca. In addition to detailing anatomy, the exhibit aimed to explore the possibilities of the human body with activities to simulate the experiences of adventure-seekers, elite athletes, and extreme-sports enthusiasts. There were more than 80 exhibits in the hall, which were all developed and built by the Science Centre's staff with input from more than 120 neuroscience, physiology, bio-mechanics and sports medicine experts. The exhibit also featured a climbing wall.

==== Cohon Family Nature Escape ====
The Cohon Family Nature Escape was an outdoor exhibit, situated within the Don River valley to the rear of the science centre. The exhibit features a giant Baltimore oriole nest, a concrete wall canvas for moss graffiti, and a playground slide made from a fallen 125-year-old eastern white pine.

==== Forest Lane ====
Forest Lane housed many trees and tree trunks from across Canada. The exhibit included a 464-year-old Douglas fir, with markings on its growth rings denoting notable world events during the tree's lifetime.

==== KidSpark ====
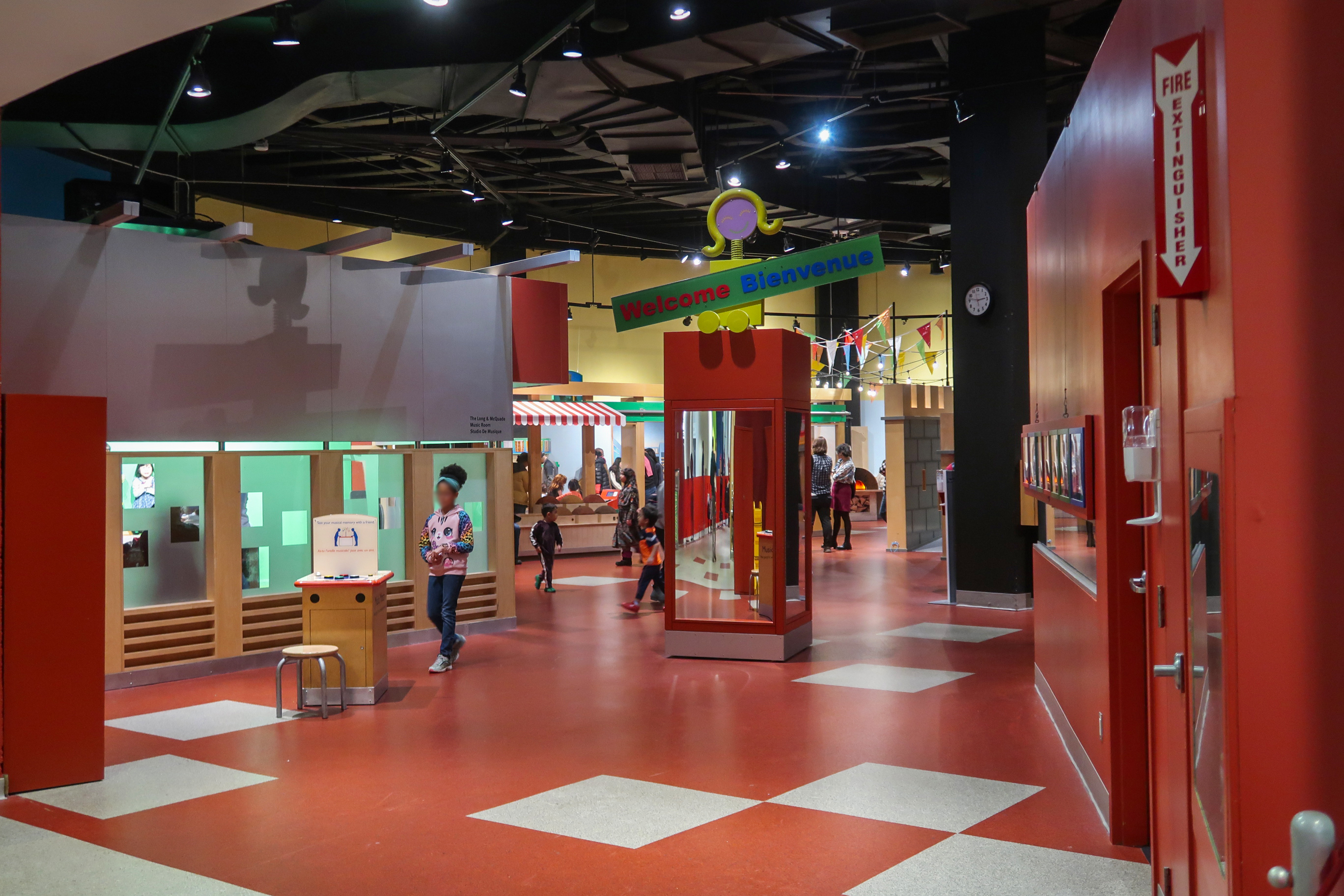
Level 4 KidSpark

KidSpark was a designated space for children eight and under to explore and learn through play. The exhibition was opened in 2003. The exhibition also has a rolling ball machine built by George Rhoads and a music studio.

==== Living Earth ====
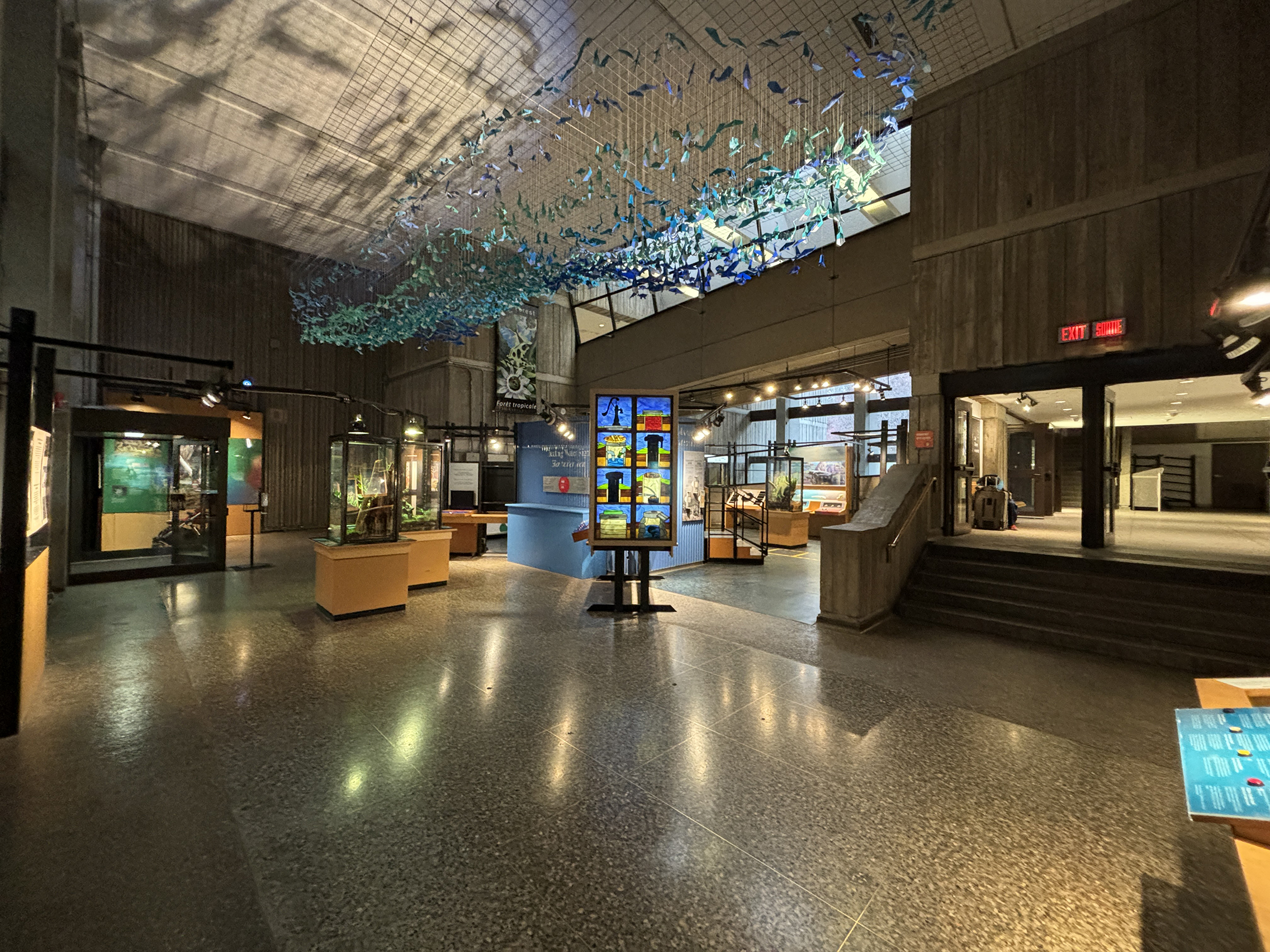
The Bruce Poon Tip Living Earth Hall

The Living Earth hosted simulated environments around the world, including tropical rainforests, coral reefs, and caves, including live animals. It was opened in 1993.

==== Science Arcade ====
The Science Arcade was amongst the oldest exhibits at the science centre, having been a permanent fixture in the building since its opening in 1969. The Science Arcade housed many "arcade-styled" games.

==== Space Hall and the Planetarium ====
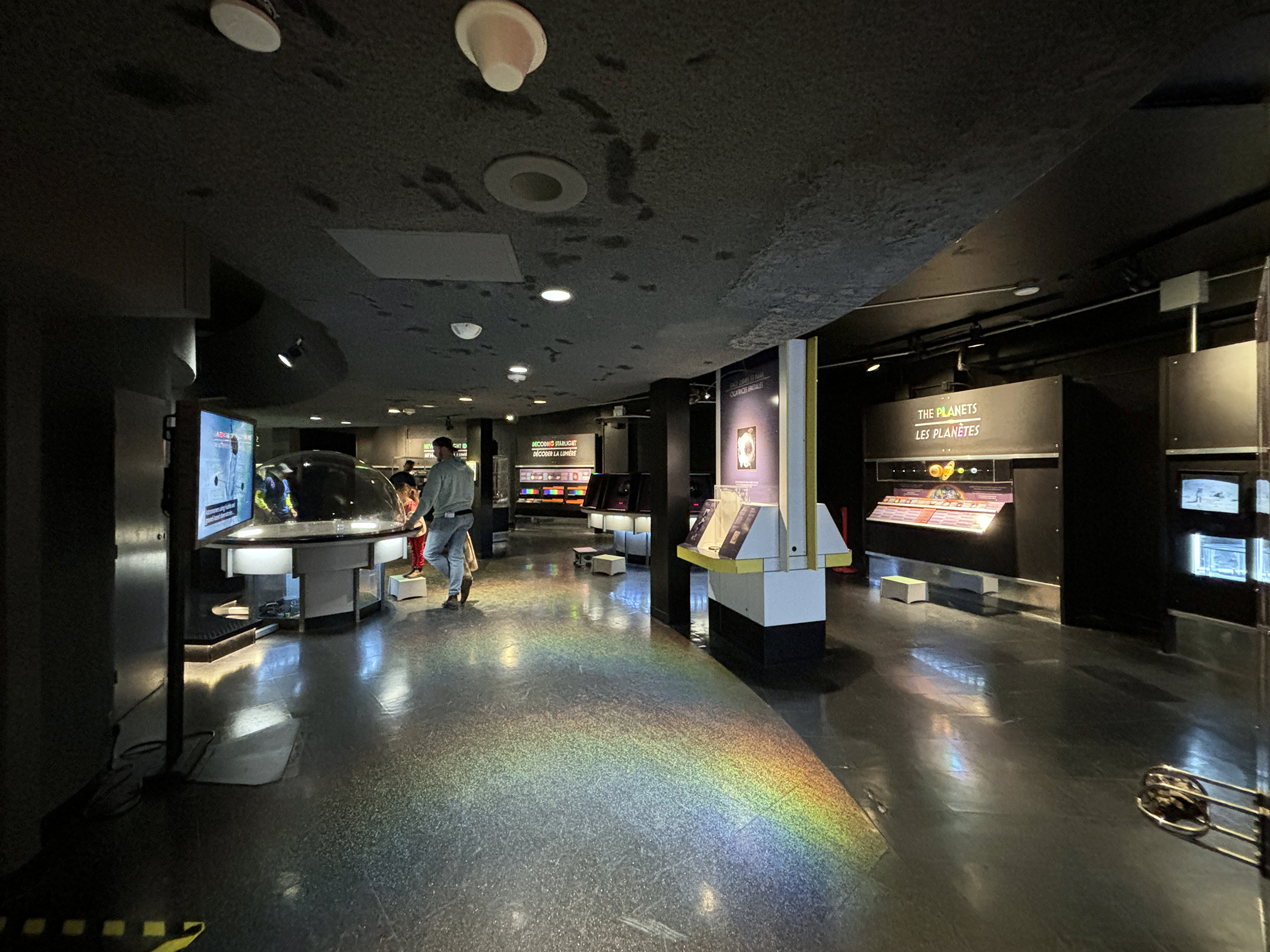
Level 4 Space Hall

The Space Hall was refurbished in the late 2000s and features meteorites from Mars and one of the few Moon rocks on public display in Canada. The original Ontario Science Centre also held Toronto's only operating public planetarium since McLaughlin Planetarium was closed in 1995.

==== Weston Family Innovation Centre ====
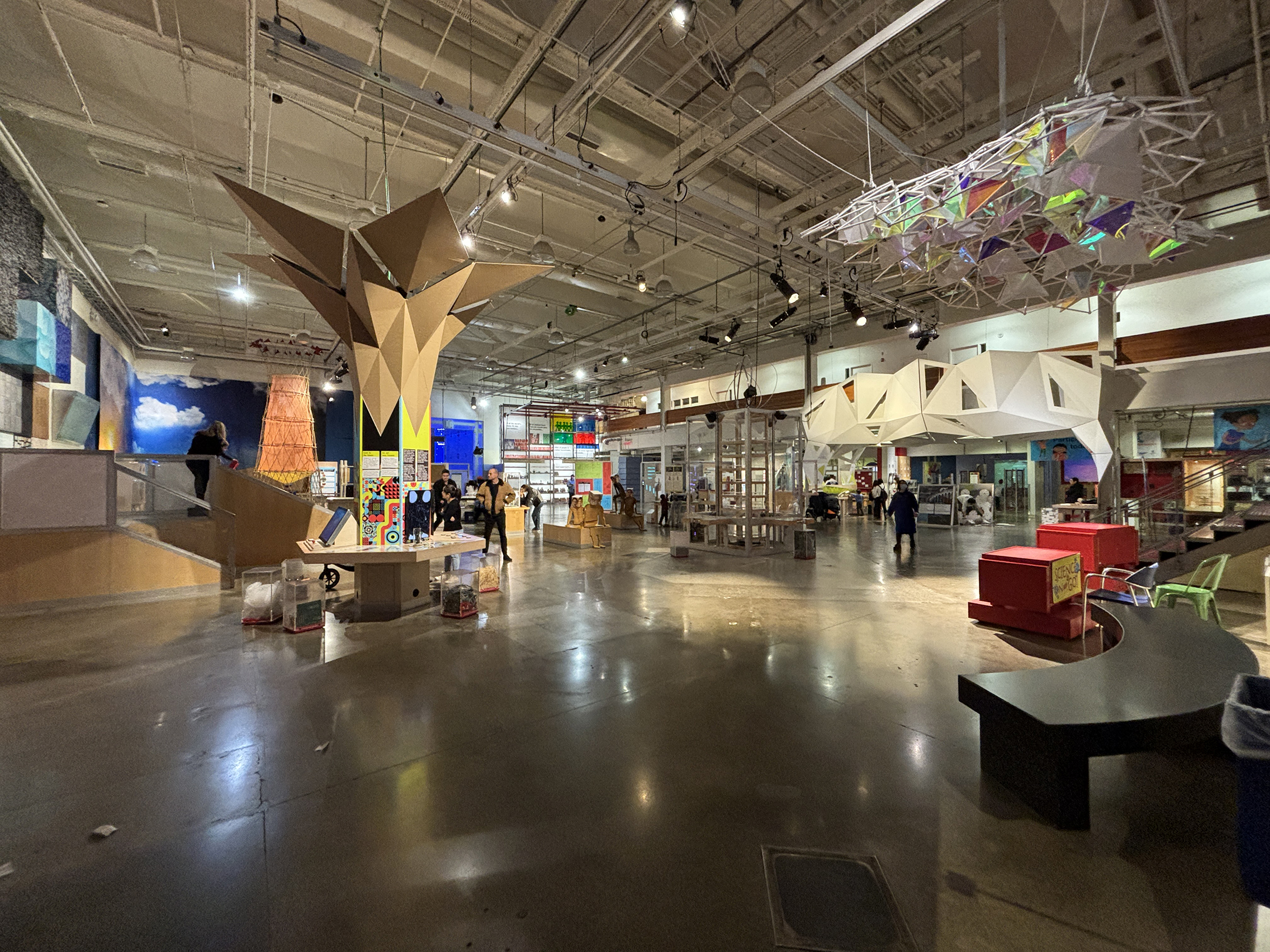
Weston Family Innovation Centre

The Weston Family Innovation Centre was an exhibit designed to encourage experimentation and featured exhibits that allowed visitors to prototype a new type of shoe and to test their aviation abilities. The Weston Family Innovation Centre housed Pipe Dreams by Bruce Shapiro, a bubble art installation.

==== Gallery ====
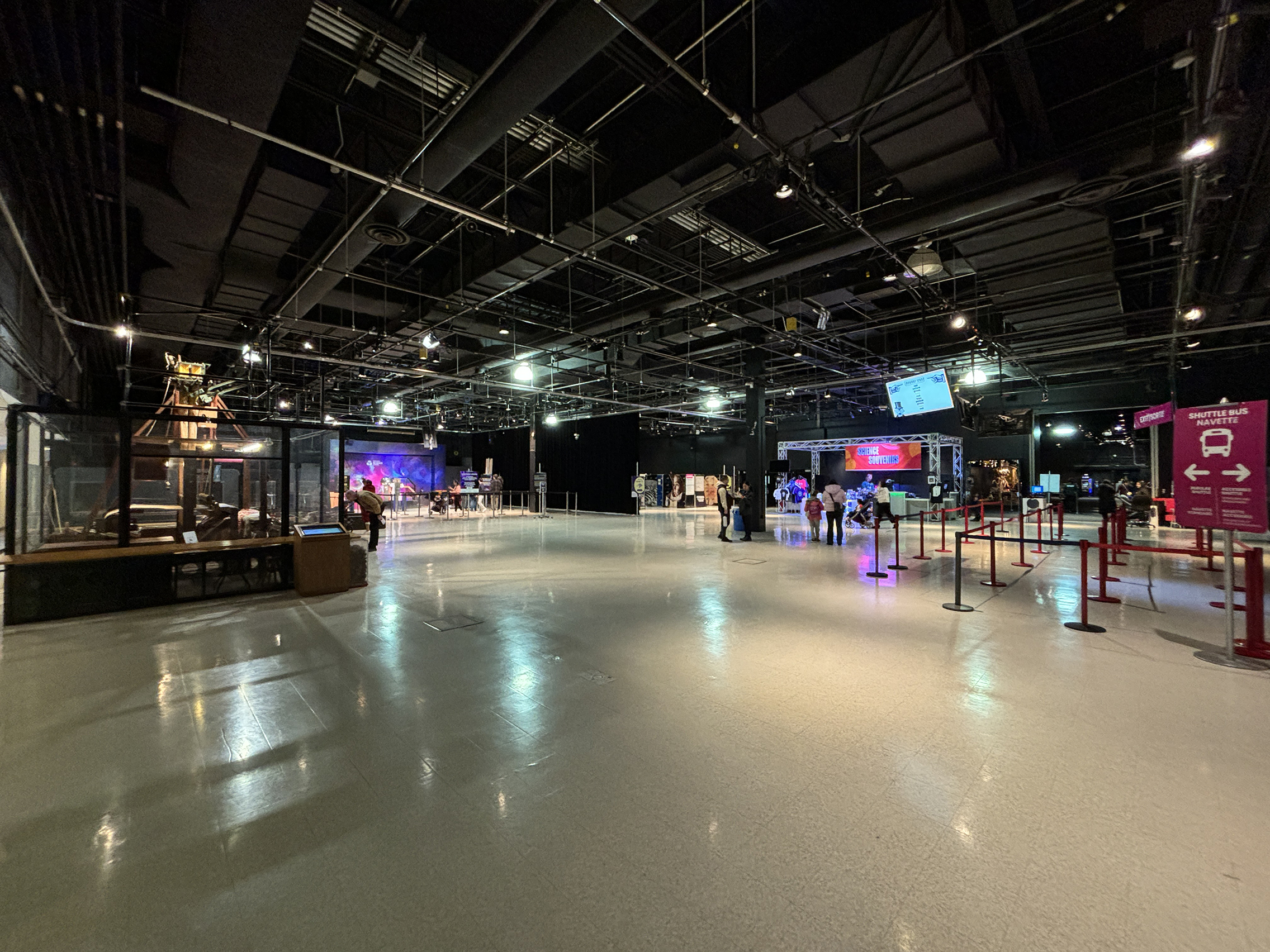
Rock Paper Science Hall (Level 6)

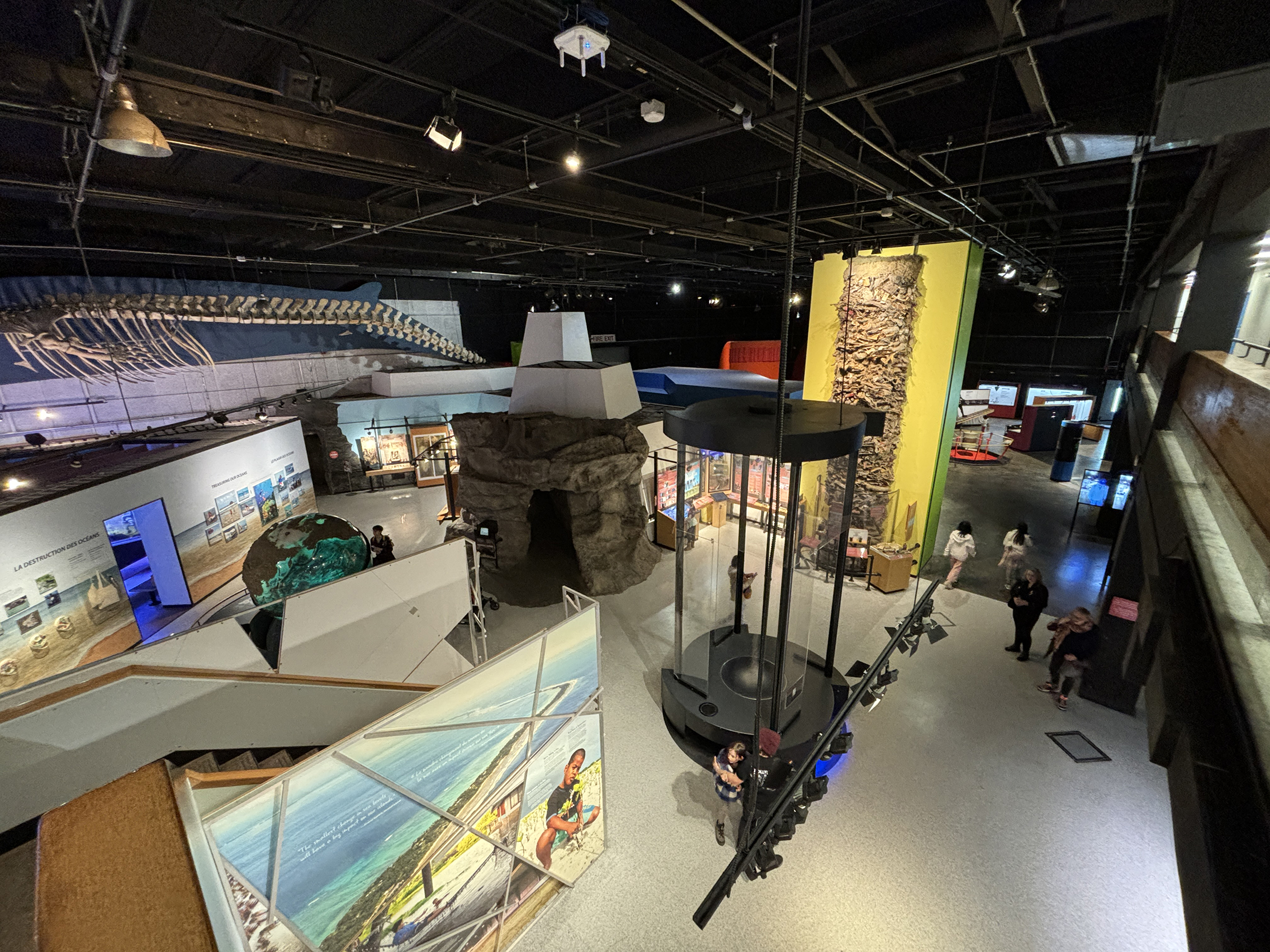
The Living Earth (Level 6)

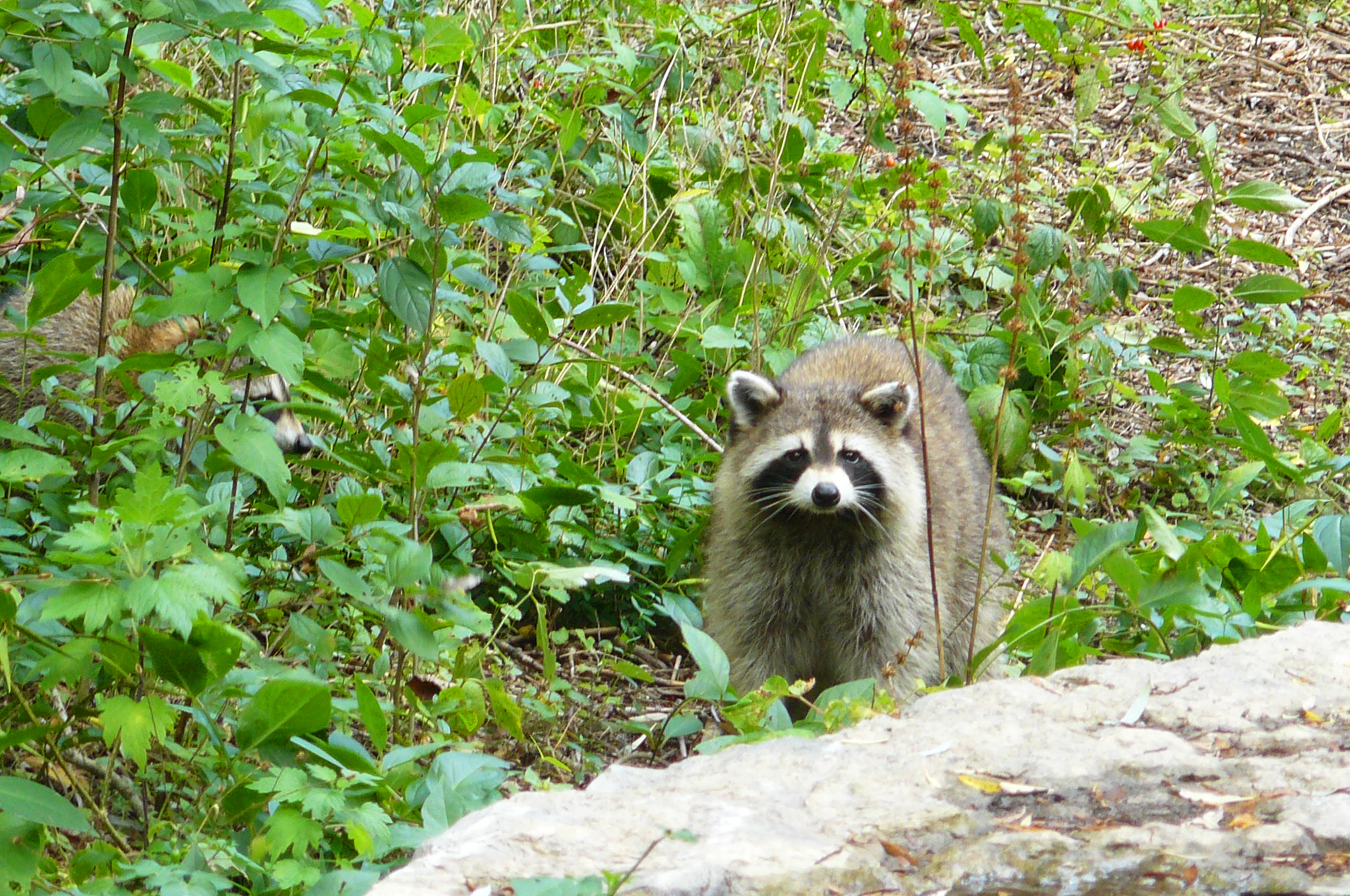
A raccoon at the Cohon Family Nature Escape. The outdoor exhibit is located behind the science centre, within the Don Valley.

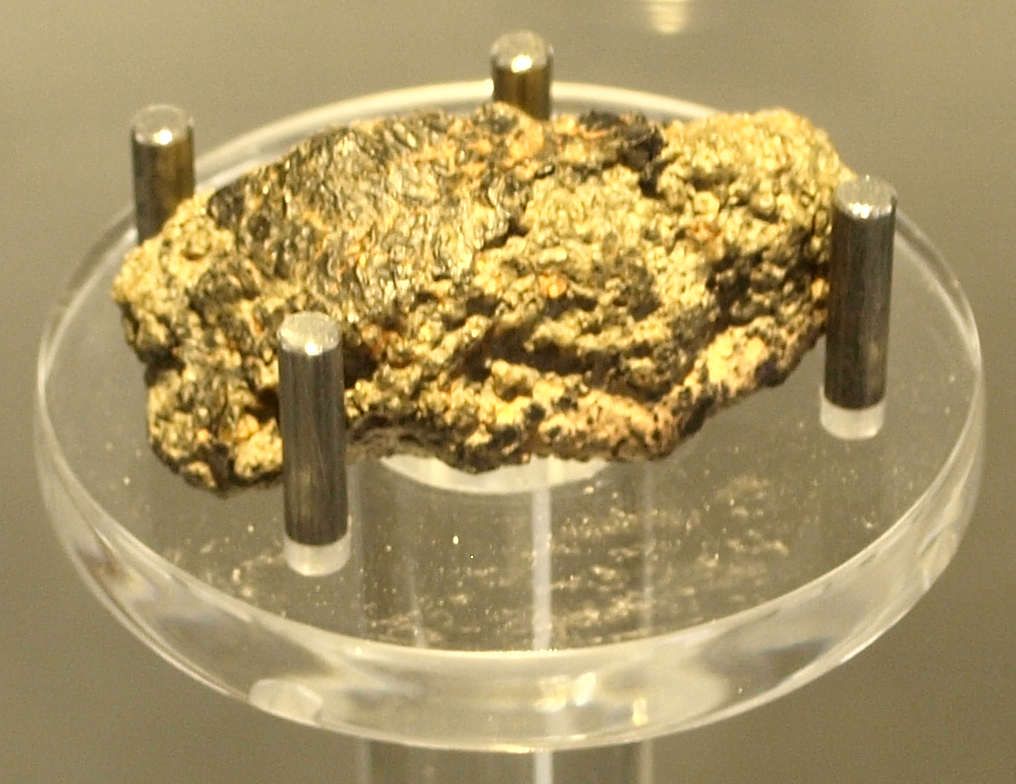
Shergottite, a Martian meteorite

== Science School ==
The Ontario Science Centre Science School (OSCSS) offers grade 12 University Preparation courses in STEM subjects: physics, biology, chemistry, calculus, and advanced functions. All students also complete an interdisciplinary studies credit in science communication while enrolled in the OSCSS. The credits are issued by either the Toronto District School Board or the Toronto Catholic District School Board, which also fund the program to make it available at no cost to students from anywhere in Ontario. While at the Science Centre, students earn practicum hours through volunteering and interacting with visitors.

== Governance ==
As a Crown agency of the Government of Ontario, the Ontario Science Centre is overseen by trustees appointed by the Lieutenant Governor in Council, who selects between 16 and 26 trustees, designating one as chair and another as vice-chair. Meetings are held four times a year, and trustees serve for a term not exceeding three years but may be reappointed for one or more terms.

== Affiliations ==
The Ontario Science Centre is affiliated with the Canadian Museums Association (CMA), Canadian Heritage Information Network (CHIN), and Virtual Museum of Canada. The Ontario Science Centre is a member of the international Association of Science-Technology Centers (ASTC).

== Cultural references ==
The Don Mills site of Ontario Science Centre was used by David Cronenberg as a location for his 1970 film Crimes of the Future.

== Media ==
The Ontario Science Centre was featured on the Rick Mercer Report in 2016. In his CBC news satire program—Rick Mercer visited numerous scientists' exhibits, took part in a wildlife conservation show, and partook in a psychological fear study during a workshop there.

The Grand Hall of the centre was used as an airport terminal in episode 5 of the miniseries Station Eleven. The creative team of the series expressed their desire for the building to be saved in the aftermath of its closure.

The controversy surrounding the closure and politics behind it would be portrayed in a May 2025 episode of Law & Order Toronto: Criminal Intent, with mention of the closure of a science centre called "The Toronto Centre of Science."

== See also ==
- List of science centres
- List of Brutalist structures
