= Moss graffiti =

Type of street art that uses living moss to write on the walls of public spaces

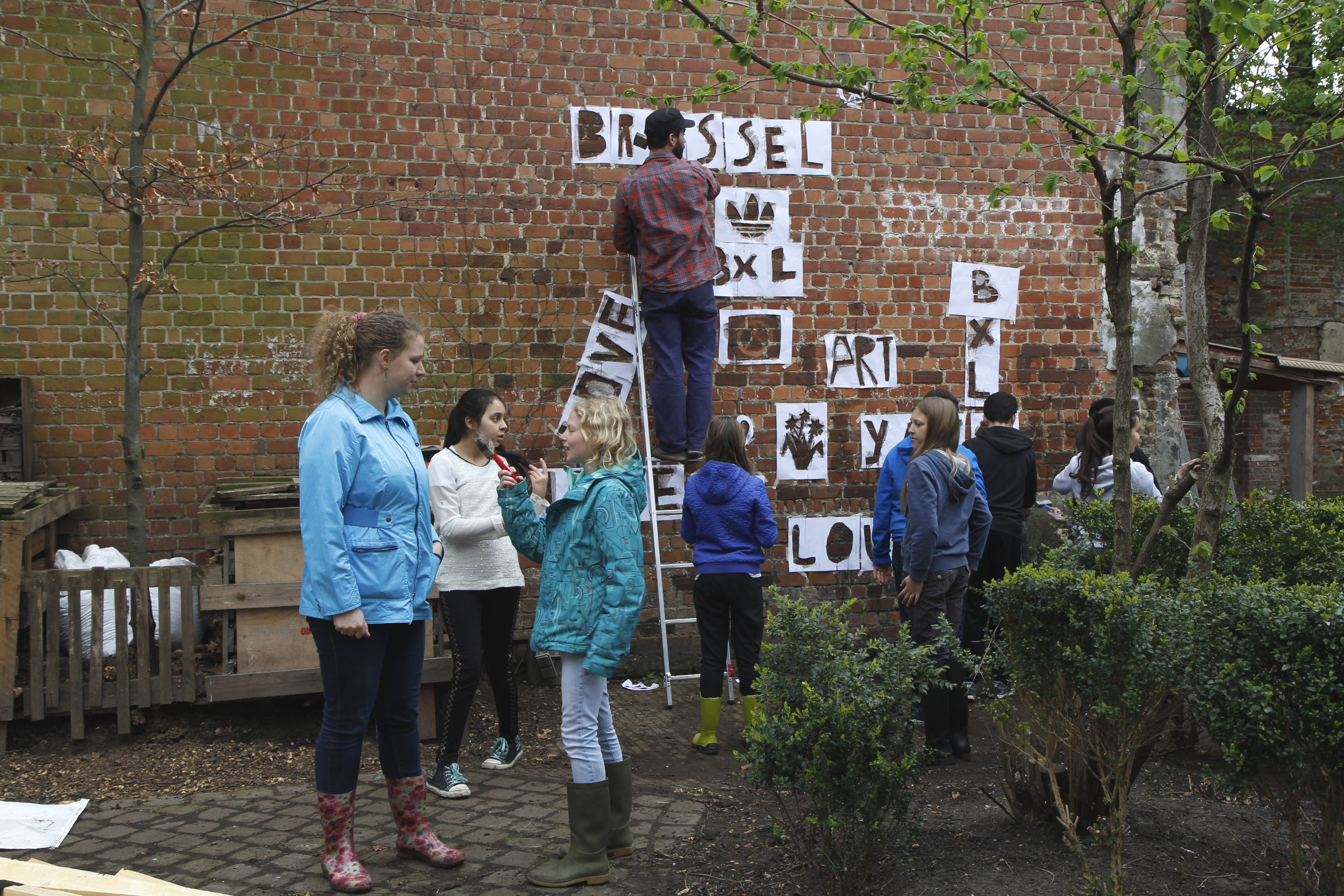
Moss graffiti being applied

Moss graffiti is a type of street art that uses living moss to write on the walls of public spaces. The art is made by growing moss on mats, cutting it into shapes and gluing it to a wall. By replacing the harmful chemicals found in paints (such as methanol, which damages the nervous system when consumed in large quantities) with plant matter, the artist can still create works without damaging the environment. After application, the moss grows, adding a new dimension to the art medium as well as extending the concept of guerrilla gardening.

There are many fake videos and articles online that claim moss graffiti can be created in a blender. They claim by taking clumps of moss and blending them with water (sometimes beer), buttermilk, yogurt, and corn syrup you can create a thick liquid that can be painted on a wall by a brush. They claim that applications of the moss mixture or water may be needed to create a fuller effect. However, photos or time-lapse videos of the results are never shown. Many people have tried to replicate the process, but documentation that it succeeds is lacking. The paste was too thick to paint with a brush, it fell off after a few days or weeks and moss failed to grow.
