= Palmieri (crater) =

Crater on the Moon

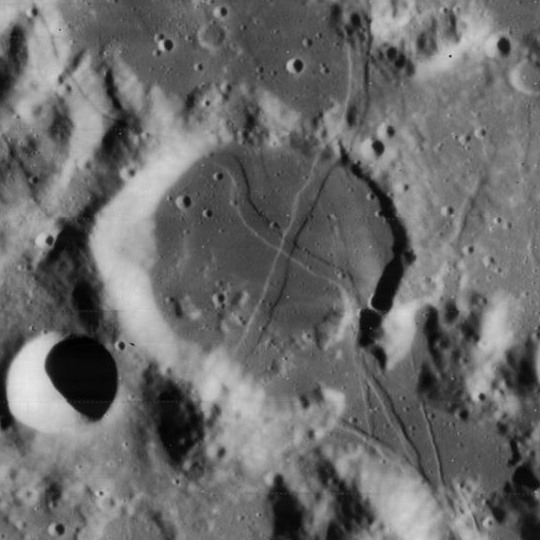
- Lunar Orbiter 4 image
- Coordinates: 28.6°S 47.7°W
- Diameter: 40 km
- Depth: 1.2 km
- Colongitude: 49° at sunrise
- Eponym: Luigi Palmieri

Palmieri is a lunar impact crater that lies to the southwest of the Mare Humorum, in the southwestern quadrant of the Moon's near side. It lies due south of the crater Liebig and east-northeast of the larger Fourier.

This crater formation has an eroded outer rim that has a gap along the southeastern side and a pair of narrow gaps along the northern rim. The remains of a small, flooded crater form the northern edge of the gap along the southeast. Just to the southwest of Palmieri is the small crater Palmieri E. The infrared spectrum of pure crystalline plagioclase has been identified on the southeast rim.

The interior floor of Palmieri has been flooded by lava, leaving a dark interior surface that has a similar albedo to the lunar mare to the northeast. This floor is joined with a long expanse of lava surface to the north of Palmieri that proceeds northwards until it reaches the area between Liebig and de Gasparis. The floor is marked by a system of rilles named the Rimae Palmieri that continue to the north and southeast beyond the crater perimeter. These narrow rifts extend for about 150 kilometers.

== Satellite craters ==
By convention these features are identified on lunar maps by placing the letter on the side of the crater midpoint that is closest to Palmieri.

Palmieri	Latitude	Longitude	Diameter
A	32.2° S	48.4° W	21 km
B	30.8° S	48.2° W	9 km
E	29.2° S	48.5° W	14 km
G	32.5° S	47.6° W	9 km
H	31.5° S	47.7° W	19 km
J	33.6° S	49.3° W	10 km
