= Volcanic lightning =

Lightning produced by a volcanic eruption

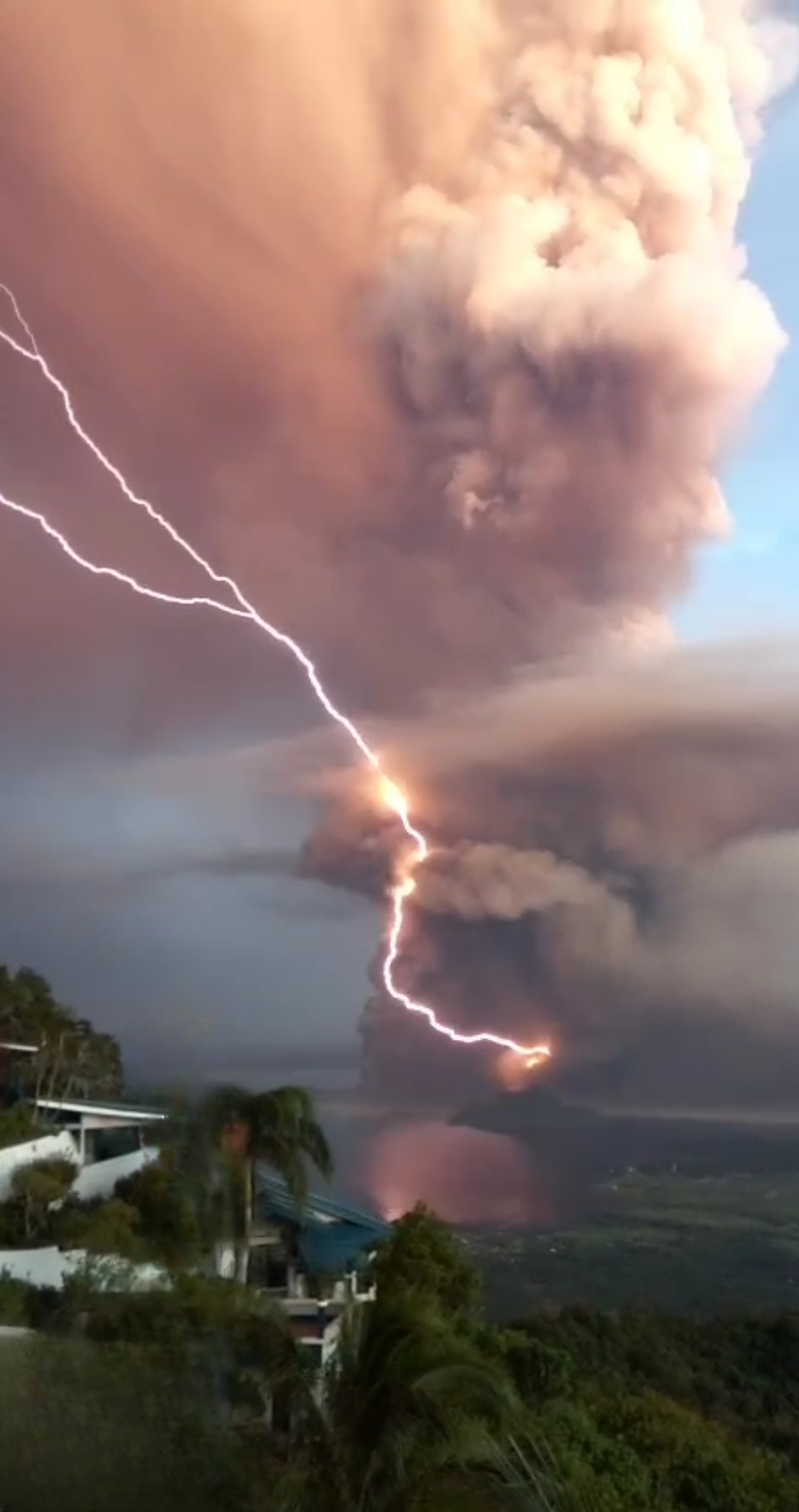
- Volcanic lightning during the January 2020 eruption of Taal Volcano
- Effect: Lightning

Volcanic lightning is an electrical discharge caused by a volcanic eruption rather than from an ordinary thunderstorm. Volcanic lightning arises from colliding and fragmenting particles of volcanic ash (and sometimes ice), which generate static electricity within the volcanic plume, leading to the name dirty thunderstorm. Moist convection currents and ice formation also drive the eruption plume dynamics and can trigger volcanic lightning. Unlike ordinary thunderstorms, volcanic lightning can also occur when there are no ice crystals in the ash cloud.

The earliest recorded observations of volcanic lightning are from Pliny the Younger, describing the eruption of Mount Vesuvius in AD 79, "There was a most intense darkness rendered more appalling by the fitful gleam of torches at intervals obscured by the transient blaze of lightning." The first studies of volcanic lightning were also conducted at Mount Vesuvius by Luigi Palmieri who observed the eruptions of 1858, 1861, 1868, and 1872 from the Vesuvius Observatory. These eruptions often included lightning activity.

Instances of volcanic lightning have also been reported above Alaska's Mount Augustine volcano, Iceland's Eyjafjallajökull and Grimsvötn, Mount Etna in Sicily, Italy, Taal Volcano in the Philippines, Mount Ruang in Indonesia, and Volcán de Fuego in Guatemala.

== Charging mechanisms ==
=== Ice charging ===
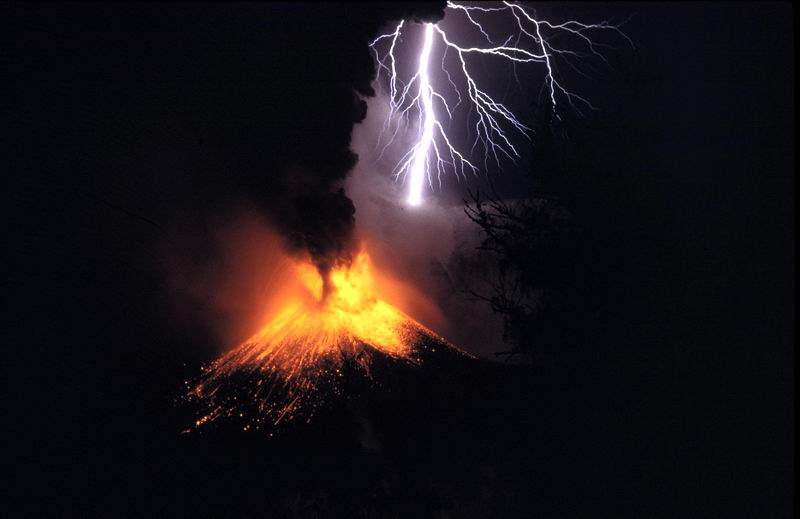
1994 eruption of Mount Rinjani

Ice charging is thought to play an important role in certain types of eruption plumes—particularly those rising above the freezing level or involving magma–water interaction. Ordinary thunderstorms produce lightning through ice charging as water clouds become electrified from colliding ice crystals and other hydrometeors. Volcanic plumes can also carry abundant water. This water is sourced from the magma, vaporized from surrounding sources such as lakes and glaciers, and entrained from ambient air as the plume rises through the atmosphere. One study suggested that the water content of volcanic plumes can be greater than that of thunderstorms. The water is initially transported as a hot vapor, which condenses to liquid in the rising column and ultimately freezes to ice if the plume cools well below freezing. Some eruptions even produce volcanic hail. Support for the ice-charging hypothesis includes the observation that lightning activity greatly increases once volcanic plumes rise above the freezing level, and evidence that ice crystals in the anvil top of the volcanic cloud are effective charge-carriers.

=== Frictional charging ===
Triboelectric (frictional) charging within the plume of a volcano during eruption is thought to be a major electrical charging mechanism. Electrical charges are generated when rock fragments, ash, and ice particles in a volcanic plume collide and produce static charges, similar to the way that ice particles collide in regular thunderstorms. The convective activity causing the plume to rise then separates the different charge regions, ultimately causing electrical breakdown.

=== Fractoemission ===
Fractoemission is the generation of charge through break-up of rock particles. It may be a significant source of charge near the erupting vent.

=== Radioactive charging ===
Although it is thought to have a small effect on the overall charging of volcanic plumes, naturally occurring radioisotopes within ejected rock particles may nevertheless influence particle charging. In a study performed on ash particles from the Eyjafjallajökull and Grímsvötn eruptions, scientists found that both samples possessed a natural radioactivity above the background level, but that radioisotopes were an unlikely source of self-charging in the Eyjafjallajökull plume. However, there was the potential for greater charging near the vent where the particle size is larger. Research continues, and the electrification via radioisotopes, such as radon, may in some instances be significant and at various magnitudes a somewhat common mechanism.

=== Plume height ===
The height of the ash plume appears to be linked with the mechanism which generates the lightning. In taller ash plumes (7–12 km) large concentrations of water vapor may contribute to lightning activity, while smaller ash plumes (1–4 km) appear to gain more of their electric charge from fragmentation of rocks near the vent of the volcano (fractoemission). The atmospheric temperature also plays a role in the formation of lightning. Colder ambient temperatures promote freezing and ice charging inside the plume, thus leading to more electrical activity.

== Lightning-induced volcanic spherules ==
Experimental studies and investigation of volcanic deposits have shown that volcanic lighting creates a by-product known as "lightning-induced volcanic spherules" (LIVS). These tiny glass spherules form during high-temperatures processes such as cloud-to-ground lightning strikes, analogous to fulgurites. The temperature of a bolt of lightning can reach 30,000 °C. When this bolt contacts ash particles within the plume it may do one of two things: (1) completely vaporize the ash particles, or (2) cause them to melt and then quickly solidify as they cool, forming orb shapes. The presence of lightning-induced volcanic spherules may provide geological evidence for volcanic lightning when the lightning itself was not observed directly.
