= Vieta (crater) =

Crater on the Moon

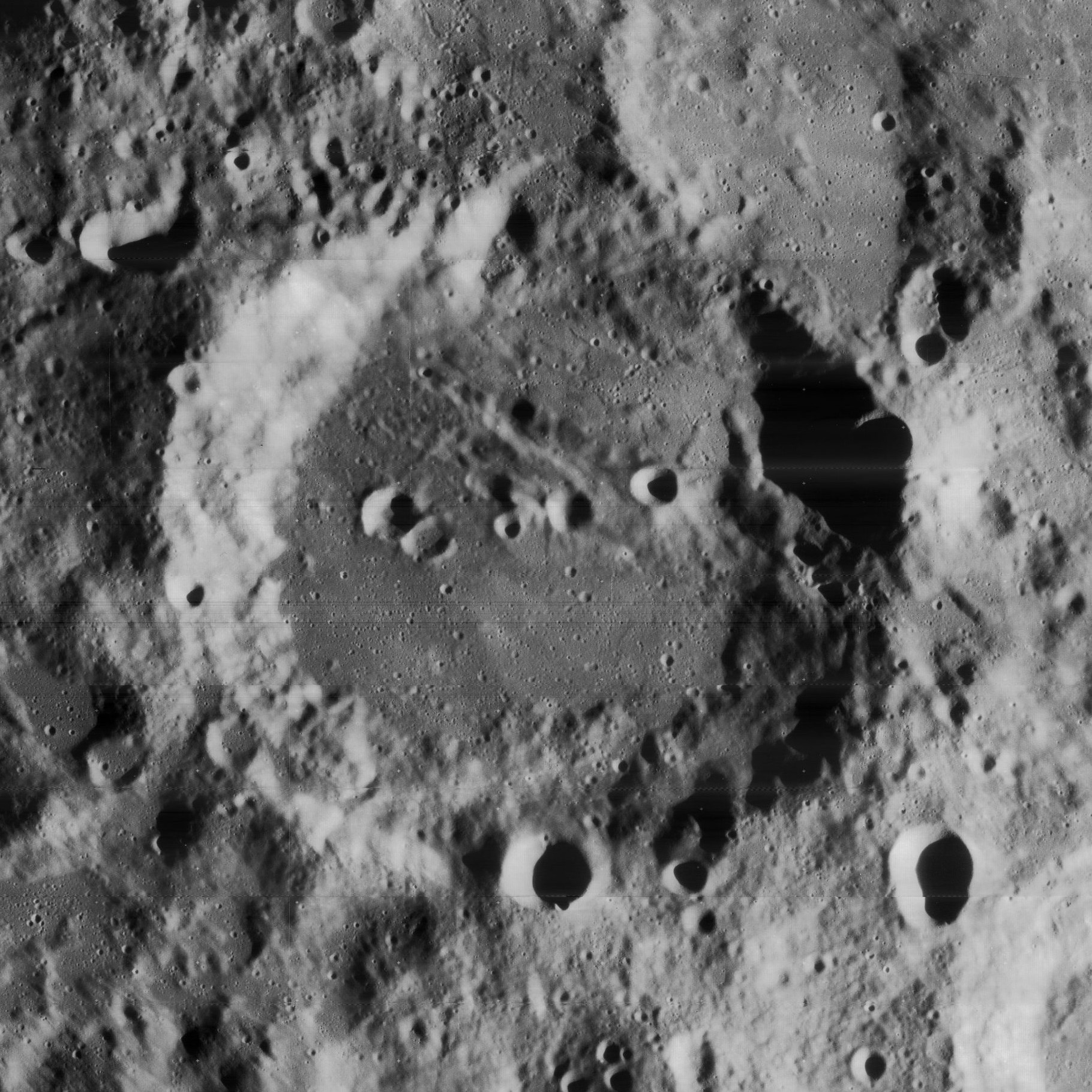
- Lunar Orbiter 4 image (black lines are artifact of image reprocessing)
- Coordinates: 29.2°S 56.3°W
- Diameter: 87 km
- Depth: 4.5 km
- Colongitude: 57° at sunrise
- Eponym: François Viète

Vieta is a lunar impact crater that lies due north of the walled plain Schickard, in the southwestern part of the Moon. About half a crater diameter to the southeast is the smaller Fourier, and to the north-northeast lies Cavendish.

The outer rim of this crater has undergone some impact erosion, and small craters lie along the northeast, south, and north-northwestern sides. The inner walls are irregular, with incised bases in some locations. A chain of small craters lies across the northern half of the interior floor, following a line towards the east-northeast. The floor is nearly level, but with some uneven areas in the south and by the crater chain.

== Satellite craters ==
By convention these features are identified on lunar maps by placing the letter on the side of the crater midpoint that is closest to Vieta.

Vieta	Latitude	Longitude	Diameter
A	30.3° S	59.3° W	34 km
B	30.5° S	60.2° W	40 km
C	28.7° S	58.4° W	12 km
D	27.8° S	54.2° W	8 km
E	27.0° S	58.1° W	11 km
F	26.8° S	57.7° W	6 km
G	29.4° S	57.0° W	6 km
H	29.1° S	56.2° W	5 km
J	28.9° S	55.9° W	6 km
K	28.0° S	55.0° W	5 km
L	29.5° S	60.2° W	8 km
M	29.8° S	60.6° W	5 km
P	27.5° S	57.9° W	8 km
R	26.6° S	57.5° W	3 km
T	32.4° S	57.8° W	28 km
Y	30.5° S	55.8° W	11 km
