= Liebig (crater) =

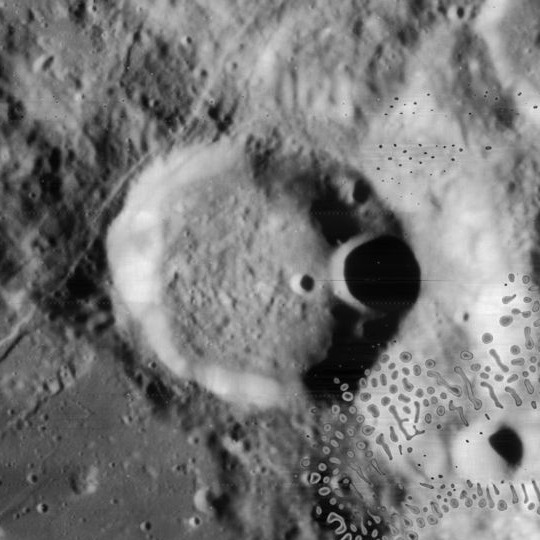
- Lunar Orbiter 4 image (Spots at right are blemishes on original)
- Coordinates: 24.3°S 48.2°W
- Diameter: 37 km
- Depth: 1.5 km
- Colongitude: 48° at sunrise
- Eponym: Justus von Liebig

Liebig is a lunar impact crater that is located to the south-southeast of the crater Mersenius, and west of the Mare Humorum in the southwest part of the Moon. To the southwest of Liebig is the slightly smaller crater de Gasparis.

The rim of Liebig has a low inner wall, with an interior floor that is nearly featureless except for a few tiny craterlets. It is nearly, but not quite circular, with outward bulges to the west and southeast. The small, cup-shaped crater Liebig A lies along the inner wall and part of the interior floor. The infrared spectrum of pure crystalline plagioclase has been identified on the north wall and south rim.

The western edge of the Mare Humorum is a fault line designated the Rupes Liebig, named after this crater. This fault extends for about 180 km along the shore. To the southwest, in the section of lava-flooded surface between Liebig and de Gasparis, is a system of rilles named the Rimae de Gasparis. These cover an area with a diameter of 130 km.

== Satellite craters ==
By convention these features are identified on lunar maps by placing the letter on the side of the crater midpoint that is closest to Liebig.

Liebig	Latitude	Longitude	Diameter
A	24.3° S	47.7° W	12 km
B	25.0° S	47.1° W	9 km
F	24.6° S	45.7° W	9 km
G	26.1° S	45.8° W	20 km
H	26.3° S	47.3° W	11 km
J	24.8° S	45.0° W	4 km

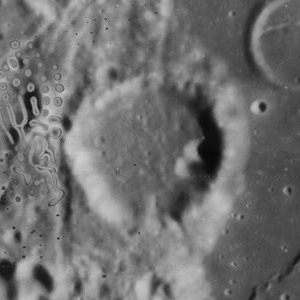
Liebig G

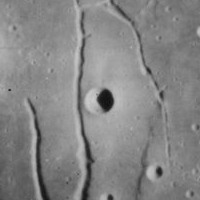
Liebig J
