= Taal Volcano =

Volcano in Batangas, Philippines

- Taal Caldera; Taal Lake Caldera
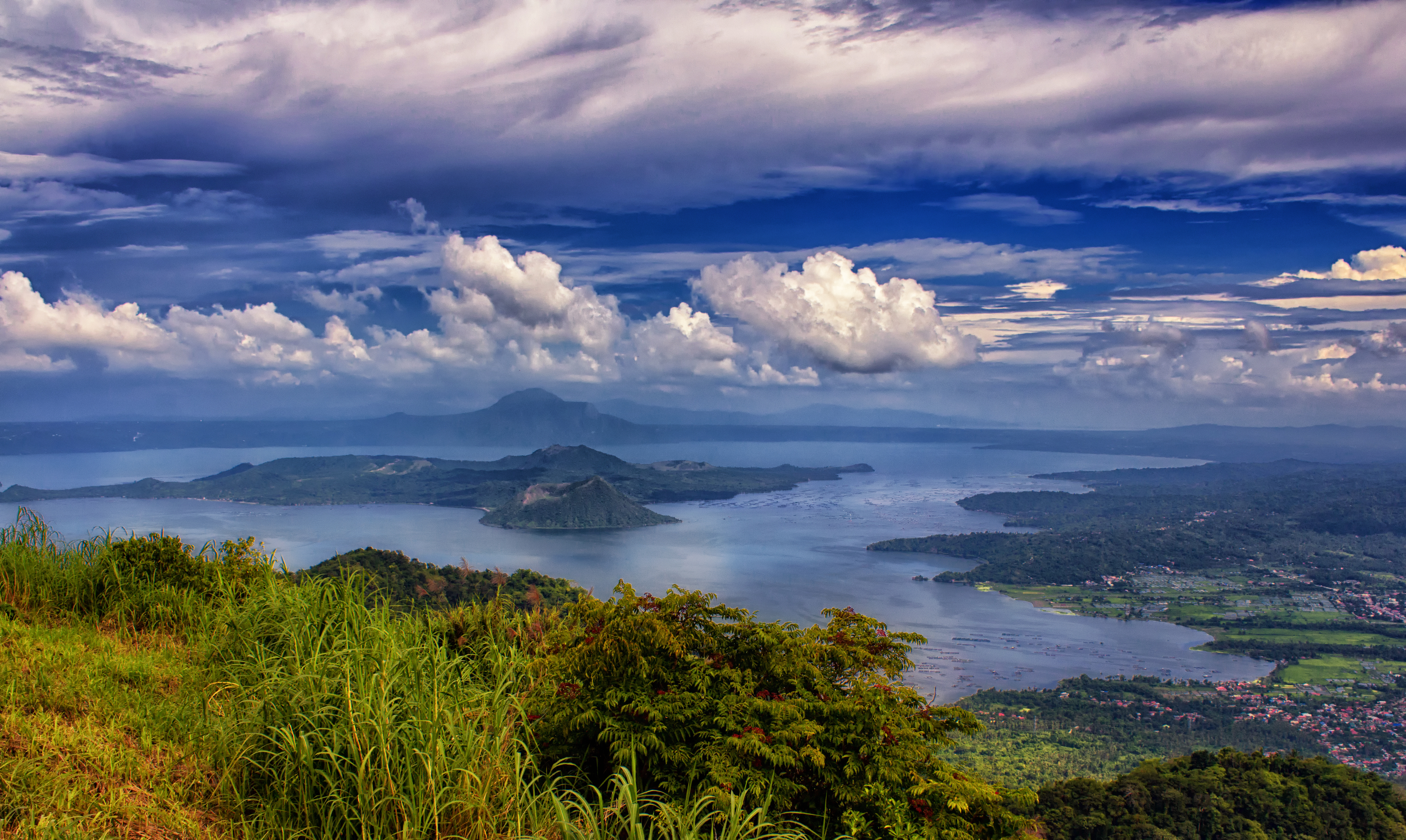
- Volcano Island, a resurgent center located within the flooded caldera of Taal Volcano, viewed from Tagaytay (taken in June 2016 from Taal Vista Hotel)

Highest point
- Elevation: 311 m (1,020 ft)
- Coordinates: 14°0′36″N 120°59′51″E

Naming
- Etymology: Borassus flabellifer or the Tagalog word taal, meaning "native"
- Native name: Bulkang Taal (Tagalog)

Geography
- Location within Philippines
- An interactive map of Taal Caldera (large red marker) with associated volcanic cones mentioned in text (small brown markers) Location in the Philippines
- Location: Talisay and San Nicolas, Batangas, Philippines

Geology
- Rock age(s): Pliocene (3.4 ma at Mt. Batulao); Pleistocene (670 ka at Sampaga Formation) onwards
- Mountain type: Flooded caldera
- Volcanic zone: Macolod Corridor
- Volcanic arc: Luzon Volcanic Arc
- Last eruption: October 8, 2026

Climbing
- First ascent: Unknown
- Easiest route: Daang Kastila (Spanish Trail)

Taal Volcano (IPA: [taʔal]; Tagalog: Bulkang Taal), also known as Taal Caldera, is a large caldera filled by Taal Lake in the Philippines. Located in the province of Batangas about 50 kilometers (31 mi) south of Manila, the volcano is the second most active volcano in the country, with 39 confirmed historical eruptions, concentrated on Volcano Island, near the middle of Taal Lake. The caldera was formed by prehistoric eruptions between less than 670,000 and less than 6,000 years ago. The cones Batulao, Macolod, and Sungay are remnants of the early pre-caldera Taal system, with Batulao being the earliest known cone.

Taal Volcano has had several violent eruptions in the past, causing deaths on the island and the populated areas surrounding the lake, with an overall recorded death toll of about 6,000. Because of its proximity to populated areas and its eruptive history, the volcano was designated a Decade Volcano, worthy of close study to prevent future natural disasters. The site was declared National Geological Monument in 1998 and a national park in 2018.

== Etymology ==
Taal Volcano was known as Pulo, Bombou or Bombon in the 1800s.

The municipality of Taal and the Taa-lan River (now known as Pansipit River) were named after the Taa-lan tree, which grows along the river. The tree also grew along the shore of Bombon Lake (now known as Taal Lake). The Taa-lan River was a narrow channel that connects the present-day Taal Lake and Balayan Bay to each other.

Taal is a Tagalog word in the Batangueño dialect that means true, genuine, and pure.

== Geography ==
Taal Volcano is part of a chain of volcanoes lining the western edge of the island of Luzon. They were formed by the subduction of the Eurasian Plate underneath the Philippine Mobile Belt. Taal Lake lies within a 25–30 km (16–19 mi) caldera formed by explosive eruptions between less than 670 ka (Sampaga Formation) and less than 3 ka to 1000CE (Buco Formation). Each of these eruptions created extensive ignimbrite deposits reaching as far away as present-day Manila.

Taal Volcano is primarily located in the province of Batangas. However, the northern caldera rim and the northern segment of its massive ignimbrite shield is located on Tagaytay which is in Cavite. The northern half of Volcano Island falls under the jurisdiction of the lake shore town of Talisay, and the southern half in San Nicolas. The other communities that encircle Taal Lake include the cities of Tanauan and Lipa, and the municipalities of Talisay, Laurel, Agoncillo, Santa Teresita, San Nicolas, Alitagtag, Cuenca, Balete, and Mataasnakahoy.

Surrounding the caldera is a large ignimbrite shield which extends in all directions. It is composed of the ignimbrites and other tephra deposits from prehistoric events. Since the formation of the caldera, subsequent eruptions have created a volcanic island within the caldera, known as Volcano Island. This 5-kilometer (3.1 mi) island covers an area of about 23 square kilometers (8.9 sq mi) with the center of the island occupied by the 2-kilometer (1.2 mi) Main Crater with a single crater lake formed from the 1911 eruption. The island is a resurgent dome consisting of overlapping cones and craters, of which forty-seven have been identified. Twenty six of these are tuff cones, five are cinder cones, and four are maars. The Main Crater Lake on Volcano Island has one of the largest third order islands in the world. This lake contains Vulcan Point, a small rocky island inside the lake. After the 2020 eruption, the Main Crater Lake temporarily disappeared due to an eruption, but had returned by March 2020 and in due course filled up to make Vulcan Point an island again.

Permanent settlement on the island is prohibited by the Philippine Institute of Volcanology and Seismology (PHIVOLCS), declaring the whole Volcano Island as a high-risk area and a Permanent Danger Zone (PDZ). Despite the warnings, some appear to continue to reside on the island, mainly caretakers of fish cages.

== Eruptive history ==
=== Prehistoric eruptions ===
The prehistoric eruptions of Taal were either large caldera forming events or minor eruptions similar to what is observed today. The major eruptions helped create the present Taal Lake, with a large eruption termed "The Pasong Fluidal Juvenile Bomb-Rich Ignimbrite Formation" ejecting 144 km^{3} (35 cu mi) of material, shaping the immediate landscape with pyroclastic flows and thick ash deposits across southern Luzon. Prehistoric eruptions left significant deposits of pumice and pyroclastic material across southern Luzon, with thicknesses up to 45-meter (148-foot) in some areas, impacting vast regions. All major eruption deposits show evidence of plagioclase, pyroxene and magnetite fractionation, although magma evolution for the youngest three of the several eruption units was dominated by magma mixing. Over time, major eruption-units have been becoming more mafic from 63 wt.% SiO_{2} for the Alitagtag Formation to 58 wt.% SiO_{2} for the Buco Formation.

Comparing Taal's prehistoric "major" eruption volumes to better studied calderas, the DRE of the VEI 6 Buco eruption may compare to the 41 ka eruption of Irosin caldera which produced a 121 km^{2} (47 sq mi) caldera. The VEI 6 Alitagtag eruption, being of similar volume to the 1425 eruption of Kuwae caldera in Vanuatu which may have formed a 72 km^{2} (28 sq mi) caldera. The VEI 6 Indang eruption has a dense rock eruptive volume equivalent to that of the eruption of Mt. Mazama around 7,700 years ago, which formed a 80 km^{2} (31 sq mi) caldera. The VEI 7 Pasong eruption produced 15 km^{3} (3.6 cu mi) DRE more material than the Akahoya eruption that formed Kikai Caldera 7.3 ka. An estimated size for the Pasong caldera may have been larger than 340 km^{2} (130 sq mi).

There is a very limited age data available for Taal's prehistoric deposits, therefore most estimates for the exact age of Taal Caldera are based on dates of deposits from other volcanoes or of a rather unknown origin. The most commonly published estimate for the age of Taal Caldera is 140 ka. This date is based on a lava of unknown origin on Laurel Island and hence, is not considered accurate.

An alternate age of about 30 ka has been suggested for Taal Caldera, however, this is a Carbon-14 date from the Cubao pumice flow-unit, which belongs to the Diliman Tuff Formation. There is currently no clear source volcano for the Diliman Tuff Formation because the chemistry does not match either published chemistry of the Taal Caldera but shares similarities with the Laguna Caldera with it being more primitive.

==== The Taal Group ====
The Taal Group denotes the pre-historic pyroclastic sequence of the Taal Caldera Volcano. It has ten named formations and three unofficial units. Each formation consists of one eruption unit, which is separated from the surrounding formations by a paleosoil or modified deposits. Informal 'units' consist of a bundle of multiple narrow layers containing many ancient soils without the distinctiveness needed for correlation into a formation.

The Taal Group is up to approximately 180 m (590 ft) thick and is exposed around Taal Lake, Tagaytay Ridge and its surrounding ignimbrite plains to the coast. Outcrops are found along the river valleys, recent road-cuts and quarries. Historical deposits from Volcano Island overlay the Taal Group which covers older scoria cones and Miocene to Paleocene sedimentary and intrusive rocks. Multiple ignimbrites extend below the level of the lake and the contacts with the pre-Taal basement are not usually exposed. Where they are exposed, deposits of the Taal Group are above the lava from Mt. Sungay, the Lipa and Saimsim scoria cones, the Upper Miocene Dingle Limestone and the Lower Miocene Tolos Batholith. Some of the Taal group could be redeposited either as lahar deposits or fluvial.

===== The Sampaga Tuff Formation =====
The Sampaga Tuff Formation of unknown age is the oldest recognized eruption unit in the Taal Group and resulted from a VEI 5 eruption with DRE of 2 km^{3} (0.48 cu mi). It is a poorly fused, dark grey to white tuff approximately 2.4 m (7 ft 10 in) thick, featuring coarse dark pumices and fragmented accretionary lapilli within a fine ash matrix. Its basal section, 1.2 m (3 ft 11 in) thick, features a low-angle cross-bedding with aligned lithic clasts. A white accretionary lapilli-tuff, 1.2 m (3 ft 11 in) thick, overlies the lithic clasts. The Sampaga Formation's extent is characterized by erosion and features a thin upper palaeosol superimposed by multiple younger layers believed to consist of the Buco Formation. The upper tuff features strata of nearly horizontal white concretions resembling bedding, transitioning into an orange palaeosol that includes white calcrete-like concretions, showing signs of vegetation in thin section. The Batangas Formation is above this palaeosol. The type locality of the Sampaga Formation is situated along a newly constructed southern road-cut from Antonio Carpio Road, close to the Sampaga Barangay Hall, and it is consistent with an explosive eruption that generated at least one dilute, potentially hydrovolcanic, pyroclastic density current (PDC}.

===== The Batangas Tuff Formation =====
The undated Batangas Tuff Formation also has an unkcharacterised composition and consists of a layer of non-lithified, clast-supported, dark, subrounded pumice lapilli covered by a delicate layer of pellets and substantial accretionary lapilli-tuff. It resulted from a VEI 6 eruption with DRE of 28 km^{3} (6.7 cu mi). At its type locality it has a thickness of 1.2 m (3 ft 11 in), but it is thicker than 2.2 m (7 ft 3 in) in other locations. It has an upper calcrete rich orange palaeosol and is consistently covered by the Alitagtag Formation. It is consistent with a violent eruption with at least two volcanic flows of dense ash. The initial current contained a high amount of pumice along with a co-ignimbrite column that laid down fine ash in pellet form; this stratum therefore represents a boundary of flow units. Subsequently, a less concentrated pyroclastic density current occurred, prior to the end of the eruption.

===== The Alitagtag Banded Pumice Ignimbrite Formation =====
The undated Alitagtag Banded Pumice Ignimbrite Formation is also known as the 'Alitagtag Pumice Flow'. It is a non-lithified mainly dacitic to andesitic ignimbrite, 10 m (33 ft) in thickness, featuring typical highly vesicular, striped or dark – white gradational pumice fragments, and a thin, lithic-dense, dacitic pumice fall layer at its foundation. An uncommon black dacitic pumice is found solely as bombs featuring fluidal forms that are somewhat less vesicular compared to the white and banded pumice. Both pumice varieties might exhibit uncommon andesitic compositions. The Alitagtag Formation is characterized at a type locality northeast of Batangas City, 1.4 km (0.87 mi) to the south of the Southern Tagalog Arterial Road toll road. The recently created road section is close to the Calumpang River, over which a bridge was built in February 2020. In this location, the Alitagtag Formation is situated above the upper palaeosol of the Batangas Formation and is separated from the overlying Calumpang Formation by a palaeosol that is orange, 0.5 m (1 ft 8 in) thick, and contains calcrete. Each contact is aligned and nearly horizontal. In the northwest, a slender orange palaeosol extends. through an erosive interface between the Alitagtag and the Pasong Formation, which locally truncates the Alitagtag Formation. The formation is found in two other places, including as a veneer deposit where there is no black pumice observed. An exposure discovered to the north of Lake Taal, is tentatively recognized as Alitagtag Formation.

====== Alitagtag Distribution ======
No exposures are north of Tagaytay Ridge, so there is evidence that the Alitagtag pyroclastic density current topped Tagaytay Ridge. The pyroclastic density current moved southward, infilling valleys, but largely moving freely across fairly level ground, extending in a fanned-out arrangement. No deposits are located above or on the opposite side of southern geographical obstacles such as the Batangas Highlands. Consequently, it is probable that flows did not surpass these, but rather were directed into the adjacent bays and possibly beyond into the ocean. It may be that streams traveled further over level terrain to the east. The depicted flood zone is regarded as a lower estimate since the Alitagtag Formation is among the more ancient deposits of Taal. Consequently, it is possible that flows might have moved to other locations, but their deposits are covered by more recent layers.

===== The Calumpang Tuff Formation =====
The Calumpang Tuff Formation reaches thicknesses of up to 4 m (13 ft) and comprises a lower pale grey, partially diffusely cross-bedded, pumiceous lapilli tuff and an upper white – beige, massive, accretionary lapilli lapilli-rich tuff. It resulted from a VEI 5 eruption with DRE of 2 km^{3} (0.48 cu mi). Pumice fragments in the soft and weakly cemented lower lapilli tuff can be positioned parallel to the cross-bedding, and in areas of weathering, this layer is damp and clay-like. Sub-horizontal white concretions of less than 10 cm (3.9 in) are frequent at the foundation of the bottom layer and across the whole top layer rich tuff. This tuff, rich in upper accretionary lapilli, is strongly lithified, probably aided by the tough calcrete, and possesses a sharp yet erosive interaction with the lower lapilli tuff. In another location studied of The Calumpang Formation, the lower section of the deposit is significantly eroded. The Calumpang Formation lacks good dating, yet it signifies the flow of at least one pyroclastic density current, which became more dilute over time.

===== The Tadlac Cave Ignimbrite Formation =====
The Tadlac Cave Ignimbrite Formation is a light grey, lithified, massive and diffusely cross-bedded ignimbrite with andesitic dark to white and mingled pumice lapilli/blocks deposited from a VEI 6 eruption with DRE of 17 km^{3} (4.1 cu mi). It is underlain by a lithic breccia and finer grained ignimbrite with whole and broken, hardened accretionary lapilli. The massive portions of the ignimbrite have abundant elutriation pipes halfway up the exposure, in which only lithic clasts concentrate. Subordinate black pumice lapilli/blocks are larger than white pumice lapilli and some have irregular, but not fluidal, shapes. The Tadlac Cave Formation has an andesitic composition with rare glassy black, likely accidental, dacitic clasts. All pumice in the Tadlac Cave Formation has a noticeably lower TiO_{2} content of 0.67 to 0.76 wt. % than andesites from other Taal Group formations.

The Tadlac Cave Formation is identified at two places along the southern shore of Lake Taal, which also represents the southern part of Taal's caldera wall. Its type locality is Tadlac cave, about 2 km (1.2 mi) NNW of the Parish Church and public market in Alitagtag. The formation has a maximum exposed thickness of 21.7 m (71 ft), but its base and top contacts are not exposed. Its low elevation, dropping into the lake, and the thick vegetation cover where not eroded suggests it is one of Taal's prehistoric eruption-units. Other examples of such eruption-units have been found in the cliffs on the south coast of the lake. A lack of exposure on the ignimbrite plains suggests the formation is covered by material from more recent eruptions, including the Indang and Pasong eruptions. It is not clear whether it is younger than the 'Caloocan Formation' identified in previous work and no absolute age is yet known. The Tadlac Cave Formation provides evidence of an ignimbrite producing, likely caldera-forming eruption because it contains a proximal lithic breccia and has a volume estimation of 17 km^{3} (4.1 cu mi), sufficient to explain caldera formation.

===== The Indang Banded Fluidal Juvenile Bomb Ignimbrite Formation =====
The Indang Banded Fluidal Juvenile Bomb Ignimbrite Formation, also known as 'SPF3', is a welded, less than or equal to 15 m (49 ft) thick, massive ignimbrite with the presence of occasional banded and light grey to black gradational juvenile material of an andesitic composition overlain by a clast-poor, white tuff at its type locality. The light grey andesitic juvenile clasts are smaller than the black andesitic juvenile clasts with fluidal or elongate shapes, breadcrust textures and lithic clasts. The lithics are composed of volcanic, intrusive and sedimentary rocks. All of the juvenile particles have a coat of fine ash with the ash coating on the black fluidal rags is commonly fused. Its type locality is a river valley, near the town of Indang, about 25 km (16 mi) NW of the center of the modern Taal Lake. There, the juvenile clasts are inclined to dip 38° NNE away from Taal lake. The formation is best exposed in the NW, and along Tagaytay Ridge. At the type locality, the top of the Indang Formation has a 0.4 m (1 ft 4 in) thick orange, friable, palaeosol overlain by the thicker Pasong Formation. The base of the Indang Formation is only seen on Tagaytay Ridge where it is represented by a grey pumiceous lapilli tuff. It is exposed for only 10 cm (3.9 in) before several meters of vegetative cover. This lapilli tuff is overlain by a 1.1 m (3 ft 7 in) thick unwelded, diffusely cross-bedded lithic breccia with subordinate glassy to poorly vesicular, fluidal shaped, black scoria up to 15 cm (5.9 in), and a 0.4 m (1 ft 4 in) thick, white, welded accretionary lapilli rich tuff with the accretionary lapilli comprising 80-90% of the matrix. Palaeosols separate the formation from an older ignimbrites and the younger Pasong Formation. Both the Indang Formation and Pasong Formation were previously grouped in the 'Scoria Pyroclastic Flow' but a palaeosol separates them.The age of the Indang Formation is not known, but it is older than the oldest date of the Pasong Formation which is non-calibrated carbon-14 age of 6680 ± 310 year BP.

====== Indang Distribution ======
Definite deposits of the Indang Formation are found only north of Lake Taal, whereas to the south, the Pasong Formation directly overlies other unidentified ignimbrites and an older eroded cinder cone. These unidentified ignimbrites may belong to the Indang Formation, but data currently available do not justify such a relation. Therefore, it seems that the Indang PDCs were directed to the north, easily overtopping the already existing Tagaytay Ridge and depositing the majority of ignimbrites on the gentle slope north towards Manila and Manila Bay. It is likely that the currents were partly confined to valleys, as the thickness of the deposits change from over 15 m (49 ft) to 6 m (20 ft). The ignimbrite is greater than or equal to 7 m (23 ft) thick close to the sea and it is likely that the PDC travelled well off shore. The ignimbrite is not exposed near the Laguna de Bay and within Metro Manila, but the gently sloping land would have provided little resistance for the PDC to run out in this direction until it had deposited enough material to loft, and it is possible that the flow reached modern Metro Manila. It may be identified in due course in one of the many layers of the larger Guadalupe Tuff Formation found in this area.

===== The Pasong Fluidal Juvenile Bomb-Rich Ignimbrite Formation =====
The dated Pasong Fluidal Juvenile Bomb-Rich Ignimbrite Formation previously known as 'SPF1' and 'SPF2' of the 'Scoria Pyroclastic Flow' is the best exposed of the Taal Group. It is light to dark grey, poorly to well lithified and contains light grey to black, basaltic and basaltic andesite lapilli sized pumice and scoria with larger black fluidal juvenile bombs. Some flow units contain light orange ignimbrite clasts found as lithics, which have only been observed in this formation and in the Buco Formation. In other formations, similar lithic clasts have a more darker orange color. The Pasong Formation consists of at least 4–5 airfall deposits of which three are pellet fall layers and two are pumice fall layers along with 5 ignimbrite flow-units. The flow-units are separated by the thin airfall pellet layers or pumice fall layers and comprise massive and diffuse cross-bedded lapilli tuffs, some with accretionary lapilli, tuffs with abundant accretionary lapilli, and breccias with abundant fluidal juvenile bombs.

It is exposed radially around Lake Taal, and its maximum thickness is 45 m (148 ft), on Tagaytay Ridge, where it is separated from the older Indang Formation by a friable light orange palaeosol of approximately 40 cm thick, and has an upper crumbly bright orange palaeosol, about 4 m (13 ft) thick, overlain by the younger Tagaytay Units. Elsewhere, the Pasong Formation oversteps the older Batangas, Alitagtag and Calumpang formations, overlies the Antonio Carpio Units, and is overlain by the younger Buco Formation . The Pasong Formation is the only deposit in which both charcoal, and petrified wood, are identified. Both types of wood are not found in the same layer and occur as individual fragments or inside cylindrical moulds, which likely used to be filled with charcoal and/or petrified wood that has been weathered out. At some places, only remnant holes remain. The charcoal is found within lithic breccias in the northern sector and within cross-bedded lapilli tuff in the eastern sector. The charcoal may be intruded by modern roots and clasts less than a centimeter may stick to it. Due to it bearing charcoal, it has been previously 14^{C} dated providing ages between 6680 ± 310 years BP and 5380 ± 70 years BP. The Formation represents the passing of at least 5 pyroclastic density currents at some places, but is most often evidence for one or two PDCs is found. These PDCs were quasi-steady and concentrated, some becoming more dilute over time to deposit matrix and accretionary lapilli-rich tuffs. PDCs produced co-ignimbrite clouds to deposit the aforementioned pellet layers. In between flow activity, buoyant eruption columns also produced the pumice fall deposits. There are no palaeosols between any of these deposits, suggesting that the eruption was continuous but unstable, producing eruption columns that seem to have partially collapsed frequently. Flows travelled radially outwards from their source, somewhere within Lake Taal, crossing the relatively abundant flat land to likely reach the surrounding seas.

====== Pasong Distribution ======
The Pasong Formation is exposed all around Lake Taal, suggesting PDCs spread out radially from a source vent within the lake. Flows overtopped the Tagaytay Ridge to reach the northern ignimbrite plains where they flowed both in and out of preexisting valleys, leaving thick valley-filling deposits of greater than or equal to 20 m (66 ft) and veneer-like deposits of about 2 m (6 ft 7 in). Exposures near the coast or Metro Manila proper, suggest flows reached Manila Bay and present day Metro Manila. The flows easily spread outward to the east, inundating older cinder cones near Lipa City, but not overtopping more significant topographic regions like Mt. Makiling and Mt. Malepunyo because no deposits have been found on the eastern side of these higher peaks. Deposits to the East of Taal Lake are 7 m (23 ft) thick, so it seems reasonable to assume that flows continued southeast, eventually flowing into Tayabas Bay. Flows are unlikely to have travelled even further east up the slopes of Mount Banahaw.

To the South of Lake Taal, PDCs infilled valleys are present, but more dilute versions of the current inundated the entire region. Deposits are still more than 7 m (23 ft) thick very close to the modern shore line, so the flows must have flowed a large distance across water. No evidence is seen that flows overtopped topographic barriers along the south shore. Flows also filled and overtopped valleys to the west. Land in between the western shoreline and the older stratovolcanoes consists of very flat farmland and therefore exposures are few and far between. However, since deposits near this flat land are still at least 10 m (33 ft) thick, it is likely flows crossed this stretch of land, reaching the sea where topographic barriers were not in the way.

===== The Burol Ignimbrite Formation =====
The Burol Ignimbrite Formation is a moderately to densely welded light to dark grey, diffusely cross-bedded, ignimbrite consisting of four distinct beds, which are overlain by a lens of framework-supported pumice lapilli and cobbles with subordinate lithics and an accretionary lapilli tuff. Contacts between the ignimbrite beds are sharp, but undulating. Juvenile material is black to dark grey pumice of a basaltic andesite composition, which may be banded in certain beds. Pumice can be identified by its higher TiO_{2} values compared to most of the other formations in the Taal Group.

===== The Balagbag Ignimbrite Formation =====
The Balagbag Ignimbrite Formation is an andesitic deposit with high TiO_{2} values of average 1.01 wt. %. It consists of 3 sets of thin tuff beds and 3 thicker lapilli-tuffs. There is a section of no exposure in the middle of the formation, therefore only a minimum thickness of 25 m (82 ft) is estimated.

The Balagbag Formation is separated by one, 1 m (3 ft 3 in) thick orange palaeosol from the older Burol Formation, and by a single about 1 m (3 ft 3 in) thick, or several thinner orange palaeosols from the much more recent Buco Formation. If there are multiple palaeosols, it indicates relatively short breaks in between relatively minor volcanic activity between the Balagbag and Buco formations. All lapilli tuffs from this deposit are massive, welded, light grey to beige, with black to light grey poorly to moderately vesicular dense pumice, lithic clasts composed of lavas, old ignimbrites, and hydrothermally altered clasts alongside accretionary lapilli throughout two beds. The sets of tuff beds are always matrix-rich and consist of a maximum of at least 13 separate beds, either with erosive and sharp or gradational contacts. They vary between welded, white, well-sorted, pellet-rich beds and a poorly welded, poorly sorted, light to dark grey tuffs with abundant accretionary lapilli and/or pumice and lithic clasts. Pumice in tuffs are black to dark grey and never light grey. The white tuffs are amalgamated pellet layers, therefore the Balagbag Formation represents the passing of at least 13, mostly dilute, PDCs and associated co-ignimbrite fall deposits.

===== The Tagaytay Pumice and Ash Fall and Tuff Units =====
The Tagaytay Pumice and Ash Fall and Tuff Units also known as the "Airfall and Base Surge Sequence" are a large number of thin beds with the max thickness of individual bed being approximately 1.5 m (4 ft 11 in) and the maximum exposed thickness of all beds are 25 m (82 ft). They are exposed in outcrops along the upper section of Tagaytay Ridge and in a faulted section along the western shore of Lake Taal, occasionally seen with changing, variably developed palaeosols between them. The Tagaytay Units are thought to be less than or equal to 5380 ± 70 yr BP (non-calibrated ages), and likely represent a phase of more frequent, smaller-scale eruptions similar to the relatively small eruptions that occur historically.

The majority of beds consist of either a. matrix supported, dark grey, lithic rich, coarse ash deposit or a black/dark grey or light grey/white pumice deposits, with occasional accretionary lapilli tuffs. Most pumice deposits represent fall deposits, but one black pumice deposit and accretionary lapilli-bearing tuffs show cross bedding and therefore represent flow deposits. The abundance of pumice rich beds makes these units unique and easily recognisable compared to other deposits from the Taal Group, which mainly consist of thick lapilli tuffs. Certain exposures have slumped or slipped possibly due to shaking from eruptions or related volcanic earthquakes. This deformation can make beds look intermingled. The Tagaytay Units are separated from the older Pasong Formation by an about 4 m (13 ft) thick bright light orange palaeosol and are overlain by the more recently emplaced Buco Formation. The eruptions associated with the Tagaytay Units formed buoyant, Plinian eruption columns. Occasionally, this plume must have collapsed to form pyroclastic density currents, which deposited the matrix-supported beds.

=== Historical eruptions ===
The first recorded eruption at Taal was in 1572, after which 33 events, 9 of which are uncertain, of VEI 1–5 have occurred, including the recent eruptions in the 2020s. The largest historical eruption, a VEI 5 in 1754, deposited around 20 cm of airfall tephra. All these eruptions were centred on Volcano Island, which can be categorised as a post caldera edifice. A similar edifice exists within the Santorini caldera in Greece, in the form of Nea Kameni, while at Aso Caldera in Japan, multiple edifices exist, although only one called Nakadake is currently active. At both these calderas, periods of minor, but more frequent eruptions follow episodes of caldera collapse a pattern that is also seen at calderas like Campi Flegrei and Crater Lake.

==== Pre-20th century recorded eruptions ====
The first recorded eruption occurred in 1572, the year Augustinian friars founded the town of Taal on the shores of the lake (on what is now San Nicolas, Batangas). In 1591, another mild eruption took place, producing great masses of smoke from the crater. From 1605 to 1611, the volcano displayed such great activity that Father Tomas de Abreu had a huge cross of anubing wood erected on the brink of the crater.

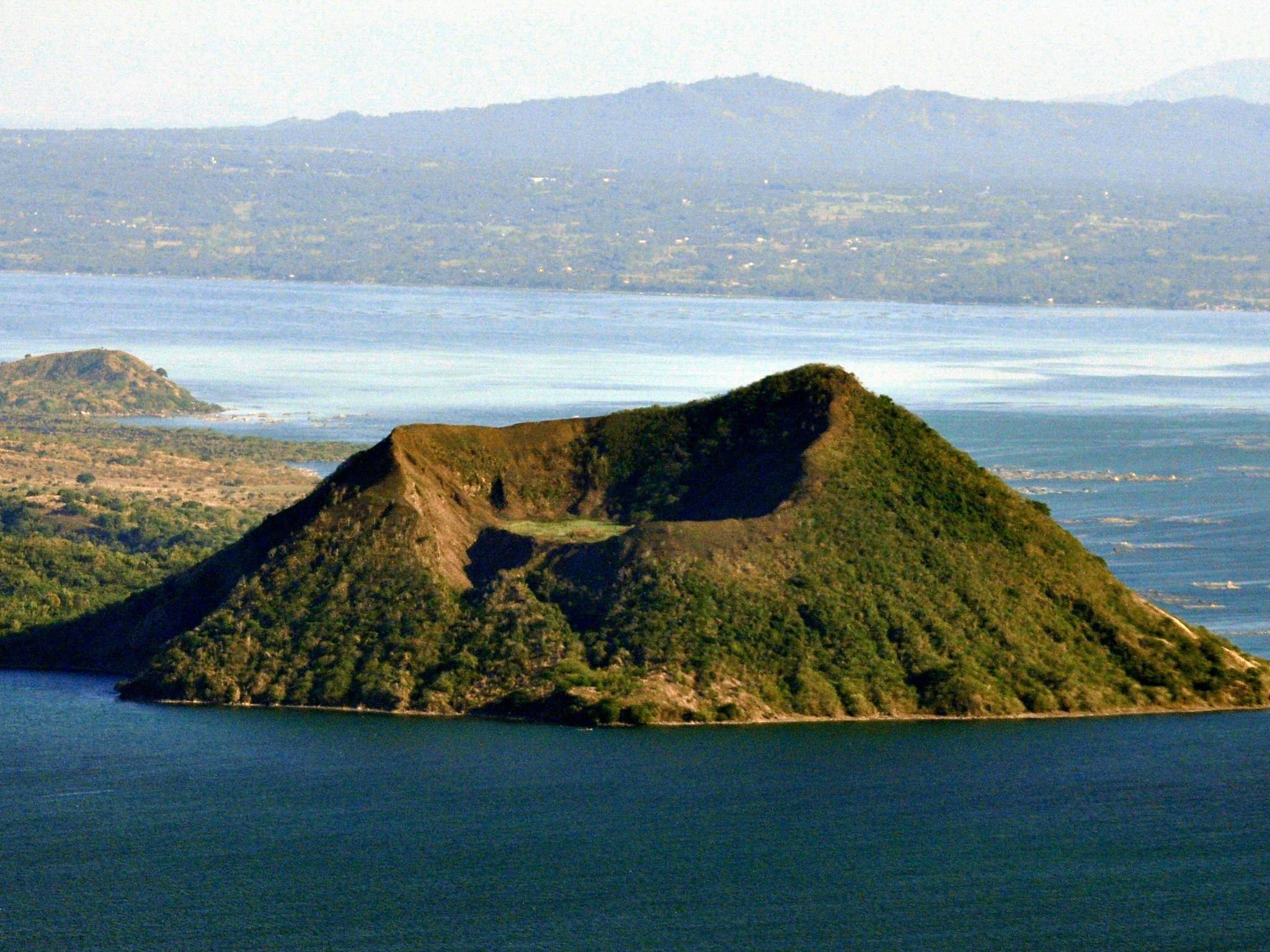
The now-dormant Binintiang Malaki (Giant Leg) cone was the center of the 1707 and 1715 eruptions.

Between 1707 and 1731, the center of volcanic activity shifted from the Main Crater to other parts of Volcano Island. The eruptions of 1707 and 1715 occurred in Binintiang Malaki (Giant Leg) crater, the cinder cone visible from Tagaytay Ridge, and was accompanied by thunder and lightning. Minor eruptions also occurred in Binintiang Munti crater on the westernmost tip of the island in 1709 and 1729. A more violent event happened on September 24, 1716, blowing out the entire southeastern portion of the crater of Calauit, opposite Mount Macolod. Father Manuel de Arce noted that the 1716 eruption "killed all the fishes...as if they had been cooked, since the water had been heated to a degree that it appeared to have been taken from a boiling caldron". The 1731 eruption off Pira-Piraso, the eastern tip of the island, created a new island.

The Main Crater began experiencing further activity on August 11, 1749, and its eruptions were particularly violent with some reaching VEI of 4 up until 1753. Then came the 6 month long eruption of 1754, Taal Volcano's greatest recorded eruption, which lasted from May 15 to December 12. The eruption caused the relocation of the towns of Tanauan, Taal, Lipa and Sala. The Pansipit River was blocked, causing the water level in the lake to rise. Father Bencuchillo stated that of Taal, "nothing was left...except the walls of the church and convent...everything was buried beneath a layer of stones, mud, and ashes". After the lake was blocked, some fish adapted to the freshwater environment such as the Sardinella tawilis.

After the great eruption, Taal Volcano remained quiet for 54 years, except for a minor eruption in 1790. Not until March 1808 did another big eruption occur. While this outbreak was not as violent as the one in 1754, the immediate vicinity was covered with ashes to a depth of 84 centimeters (33 in). The eruption brought great changes in the interior of the crater, according to chroniclers of that time. According to Friar Miguel Saderra Maso, "Before [the eruption], the bottom looked very deep and seemed unfathomable, but at the bottom, a liquid mass was seen in continual ebullition. After the eruption, the crater had widened and the pond within it had been reduced to one-third and the rest of the crater floor was higher and dry enough to walk over it. The height of the crater walls has diminished and near the center of the new crater floor, a little hill that continually emitted smoke. On its sides were several wells, one of which was especially remarkable for its size."

On July 19, 1874, an eruption of gases and ashes from the volcano killed all the livestock on the volcano island. From November 12–15, 1878, ashes ejected by the volcano covered the entire island. Another eruption took place in 1904, which created a new outlet in the southeastern wall of the principal crater. Before 2020, the last eruption from the main crater was in 1911, which obliterated the crater floor creating the present lake. In 1965, a huge explosion sliced off a huge part of the island, moving activity to a new eruption center, Mount Tabaro.

==== 1911 eruption ====
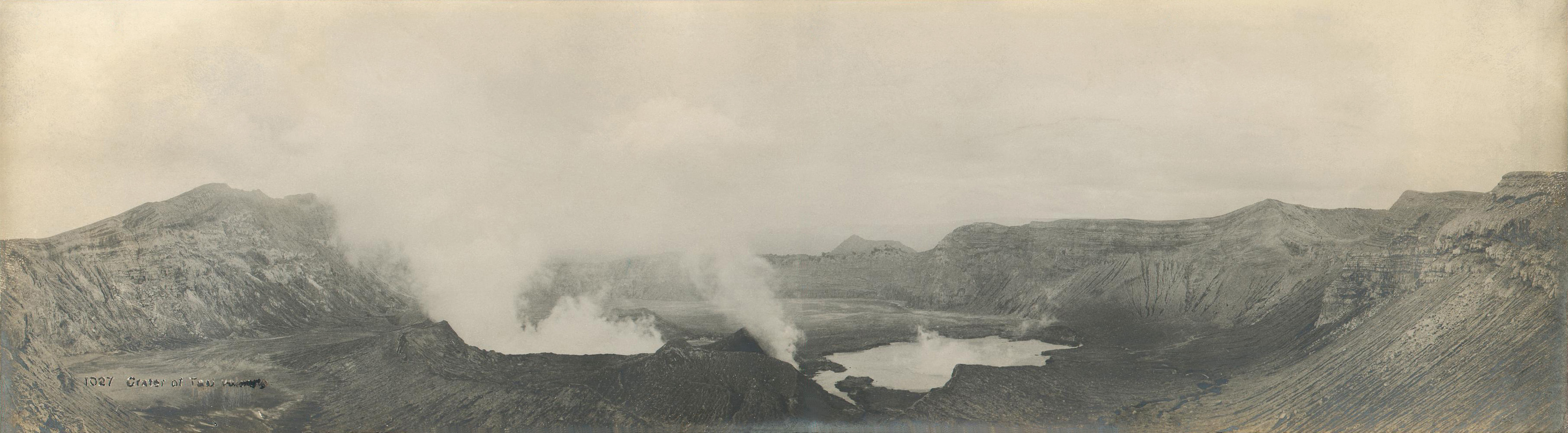
Taal Volcano's crater before the 1911 eruption, with the central cone and one of the lakes on the crater floor

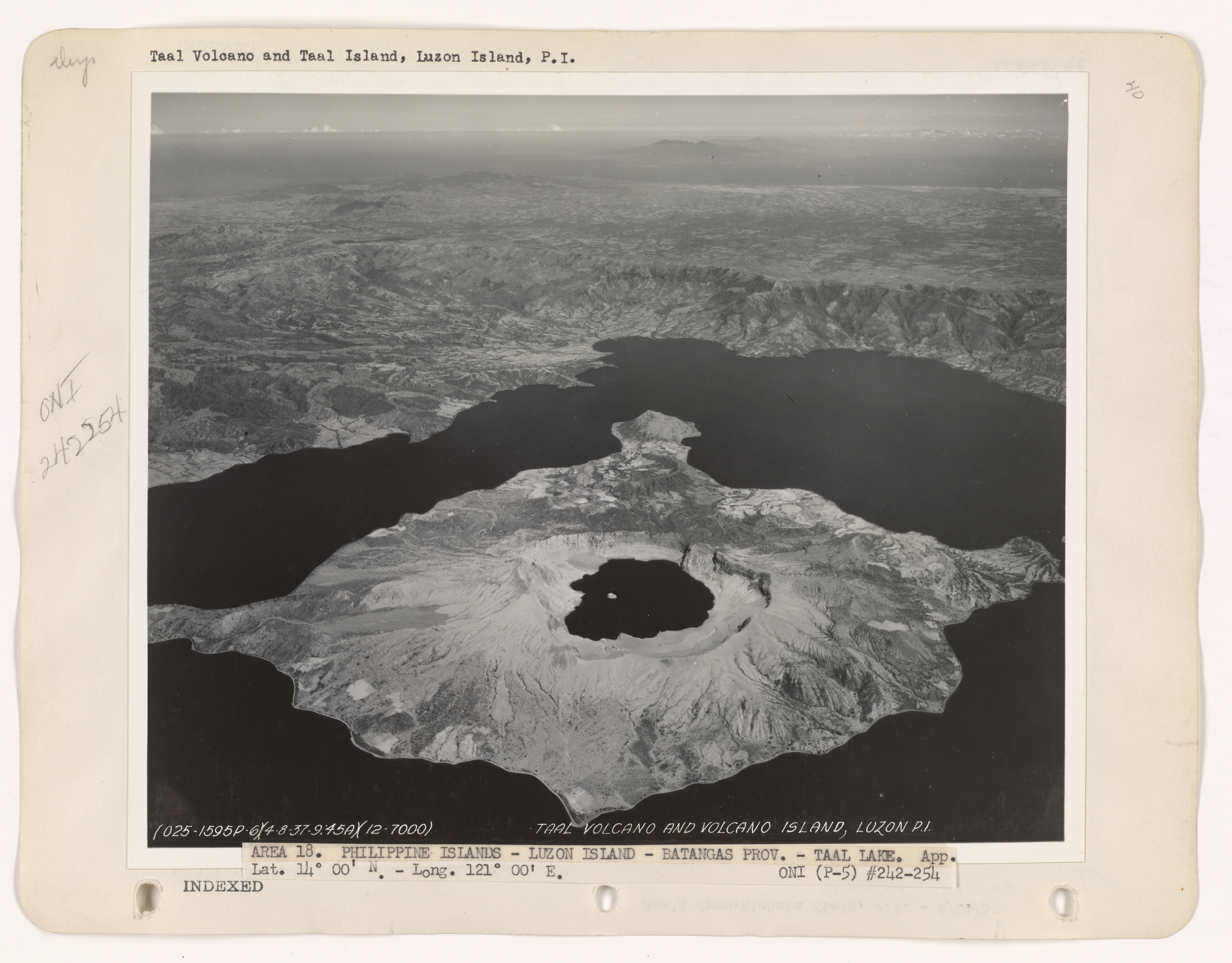
Aerial view of Taal Volcano in Lake Taal, circa 1930s

One of the more devastating eruptions of Taal took place in January 1911. During the night of the 27th of that month, the seismographs at the Manila Observatory commenced to register frequent disturbances, which were at first of insignificant importance, but increased rapidly in frequency and intensity. The total recorded shocks on that day numbered 26. During the 28th there were recorded 217 distinct shocks, of which 135 were microseismic and 10 quite severe. The frequent and increasingly strong earthquakes caused much alarm in Manila, but the observatory staff was soon able to locate their epicenter in the region of Taal Volcano and assured the public that Manila was in no danger, as Taal was some 60 kilometers (37 mi) away, too far to directly damage the city.

In Manila, in the early hours of January 30, people were awakened by what they at first perceived as loud thunder. The illusion was heightened when lightning illuminated the southern skies. A huge, fan-shaped cloud of what looked like black smoke ascended to great heights, crisscrossed with a brilliant display of volcanic lightning. This cloud finally shot up in the air, spread, then dissipated, marking the culmination of the eruption, at about 2:30 am.

On Volcano Island, the destruction was complete. It seems that when the black, fan-shaped cloud spread, it created a blast downward that forced hot steam and gases down the slopes of the crater, accompanied by a shower of hot mud and sand. Many trees had their bark shredded and cut away from the surface by the hot sand and mud. This shower was the main cause of the loss of life and destruction of property around the volcano. The fact that practically all the vegetation was bent downward, away from the crater, suggested that there must have been a very strong blast down the outside slopes of the cone. Very little vegetation was actually burned or even scorched. Six hours after the explosion, dust from the crater was noticeable in Manila as it settled on furniture and other polished surfaces. The solid matter ejected had a volume of between 70 and 80 million cubic meters (2,500 and 2,800 million cubic feet). Ash fell over an area of 2,000 square kilometers (770 mi^{2}), although the area in which actual destruction took place measured only 230 square kilometers (89 mi^{2}). The detonation from the explosion was heard over an area more than 1,000 kilometers (600 mi) in diameter.

===== Death toll =====
The eruption of the volcano claimed a reported 1100 lives and injured 199, although it is assumed that more perished than the official records show. The seven barangays that existed on the island previous to the eruption were completely wiped out. Post mortem examination of the victims seemed to show that practically all had died of scalding by hot steam and/or hot mud. The devastating effects of the blast reached the west shore of the lake, where a number of villages were also destroyed. 702 cattle were killed and 543 nipa houses destroyed. Crops suffered from the deposit of ashes that fell to a depth of almost half an inch in places near the shore of the lake.

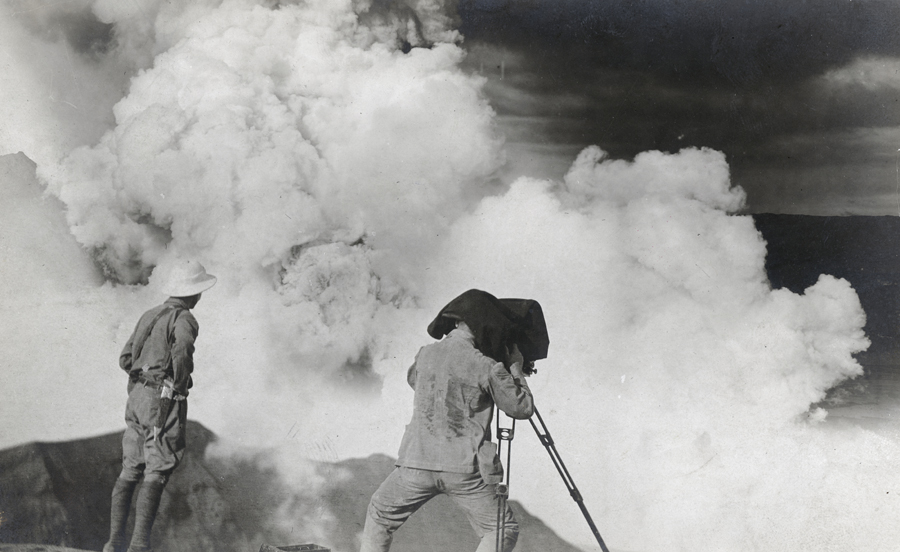
Photographer and geologist observing an eruption of Taal volcano in April 1912

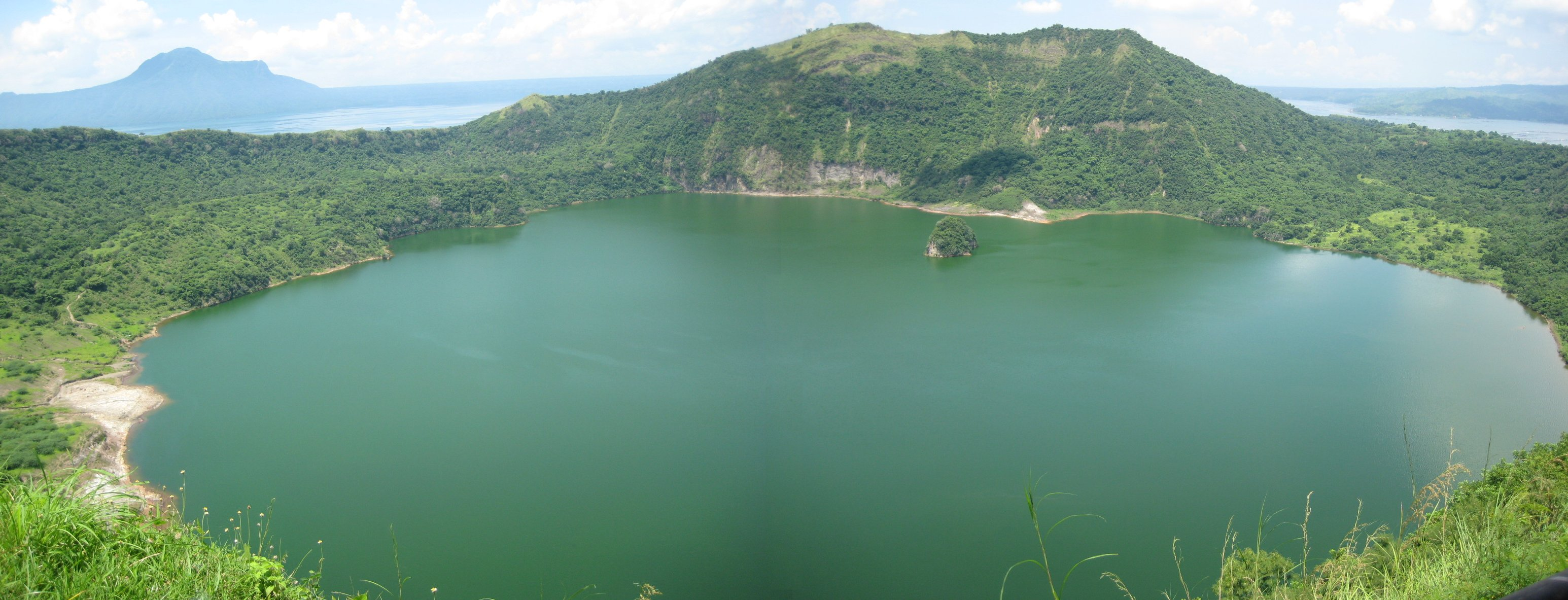
Main Crater with Vulcan Point Island in 2009

===== Aftermath =====
Volcano Island sank between 1 and 3 meters (3 and 10 ft) as a result of the eruption. It was also found that the southern shore of Lake Taal sank because of the eruption. No evidences of lava could be discovered anywhere, nor have geologists been able to trace any visible records of a lava flow having occurred at any time on the volcano during the eruption. Another peculiarity of the geologic aspects of Taal is the fact that no sulphur has been found on the volcano. The yellow deposits and encrustations noticeable in the crater and its vicinity are iron salts, according to chemical analysis. A slight smell of sulfur was perceptible at the volcano, which came from the gases that escaped from the crater.

Great changes took place in the crater after the eruption. Before 1911, the crater floor was higher than Taal lake and had several separate openings in which there were lakes of different colors. There was a green lake, a yellow lake, a red lake and some holes filled with hot water from which steam issued. Many places were covered with a shaky crust of volcanic material, full of crevices, which was always hot and on which it was rather dangerous to walk. Immediately after the explosion, the various colored lakes had disappeared and in their place was one large lake, about ten feet below the level of the lake surrounding the island. The crater lake gradually rose to the level of the water in Taal Lake. Popular opinions after the creation of the lake held that the presence of the water in the crater cooled off the material below and thus lessened the chances of an explosion or the extinction of the volcano. This explanation has since been rejected by experts. The subsequent eruptions in 1965 and successive activity came from a new eruptive center, Mount Tabaro.

Ten years after the eruption, no changes in the general outline of the island could be discerned from a distance. On the island, however, many changes were noted. The vegetation had increased; great stretches that were formerly barren and covered with white ashes and cinders became covered with vegetation.

==== 1965 to 1977 eruptions ====
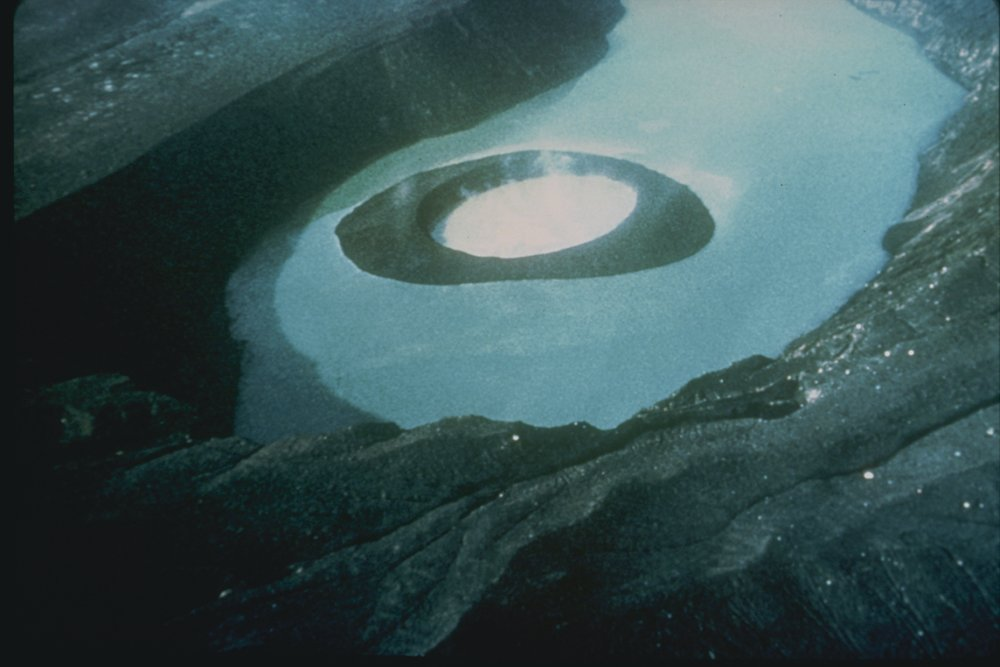
Cinder cone and embayment created by the 1965 eruption

There was another period of volcanic activity on Taal from 1965 to 1977, with the area of activity concentrated in the vicinity of Mount Tabaro. The 1965 eruption was classified as phreatomagmatic, generated by the interaction of magma with the lake water to produce the violent explosion that cut an embayment on Volcano Island. The eruption generated "cold" base surges which travelled several kilometers across Lake Taal, devastating villages on the lake shore and killing about a hundred people.

One American geologist, who had witnessed an atomic bomb explosion as a soldier, visited the volcano shortly after the 1965 eruption and recognised "base surge" (now called pyroclastic surge) as a process in volcanic eruption.

Precursory signs were not interpreted correctly until after the eruption; the population of the island was evacuated only after the onset of the eruption.

After nine months of repose, Taal reactivated on July 5, 1966, with another phreatomagmatic eruption from Mount Tabaro, followed by another similar eruption on August 16, 1967. The Strombolian eruptions, which started five months after on January 31, 1968, produced the first historical lava fountaining witnessed from Taal. Another Strombolian eruption followed a year later on October 29, 1969. The massive flows from the two eruptions eventually covered the bay created by the 1965 eruption, reaching the shore of Lake Taal. The last major activities on the volcano during this period were the phreatic eruptions of 1976 and 1977.

==== Early 21st century ====
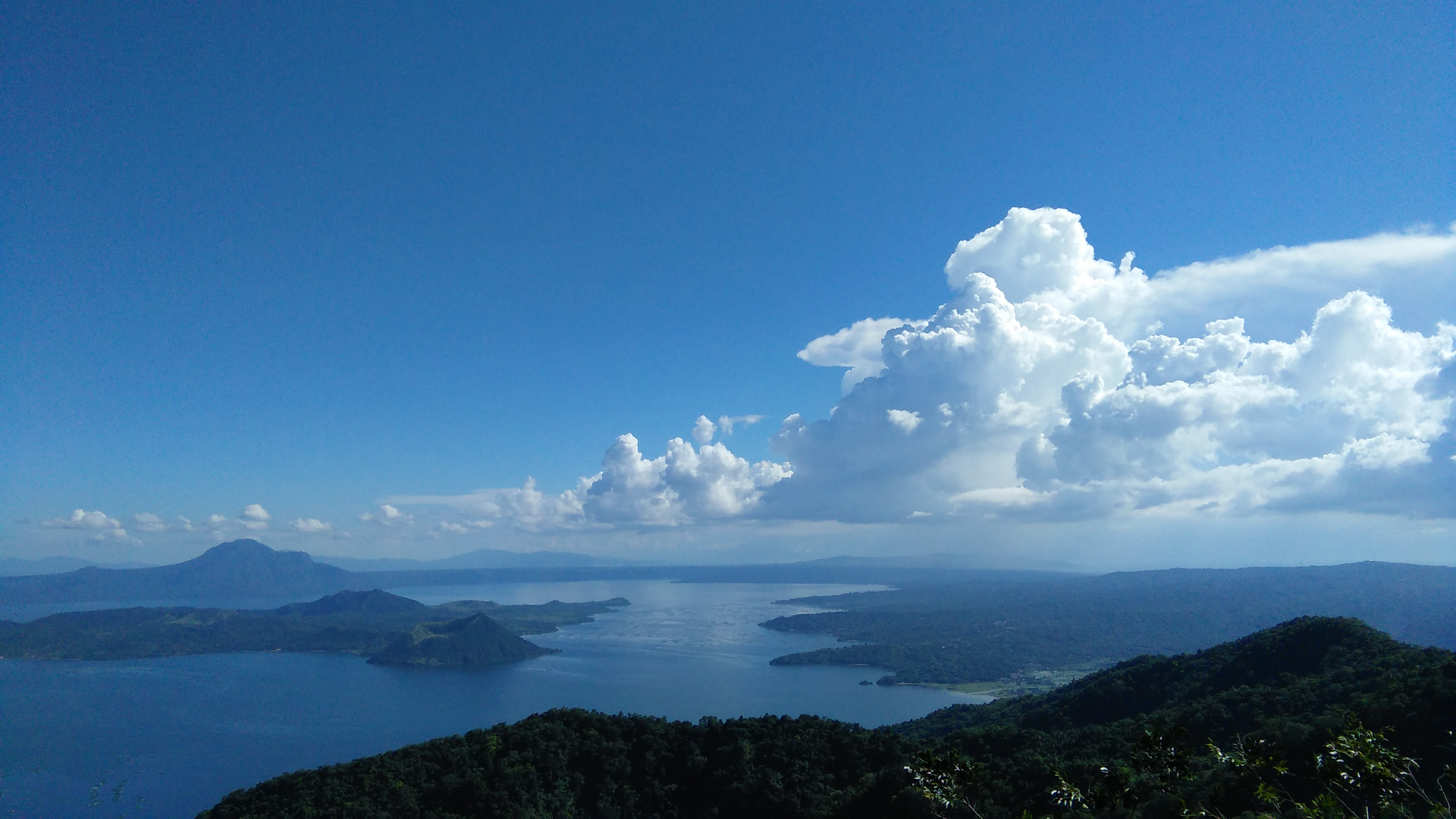
Taal Volcano is a caldera located on the island of Luzon in the Philippines.

Since the 1977 eruption, the volcano had shown signs of unrest since 1991, with strong seismic activity and ground fracturing events as well as the formation of small mud pots and mud geysers on parts of the island. The Philippine Institute of Volcanology and Seismology (PHIVOLCS) regularly issued notices and warnings about current activity at Taal, including about the ongoing seismic unrest.

===== 2008 =====
On August 28, the PHIVOLCS notified the public and authorities that the Taal seismic network recorded 10 volcanic earthquakes from 05:30 to 15:00.

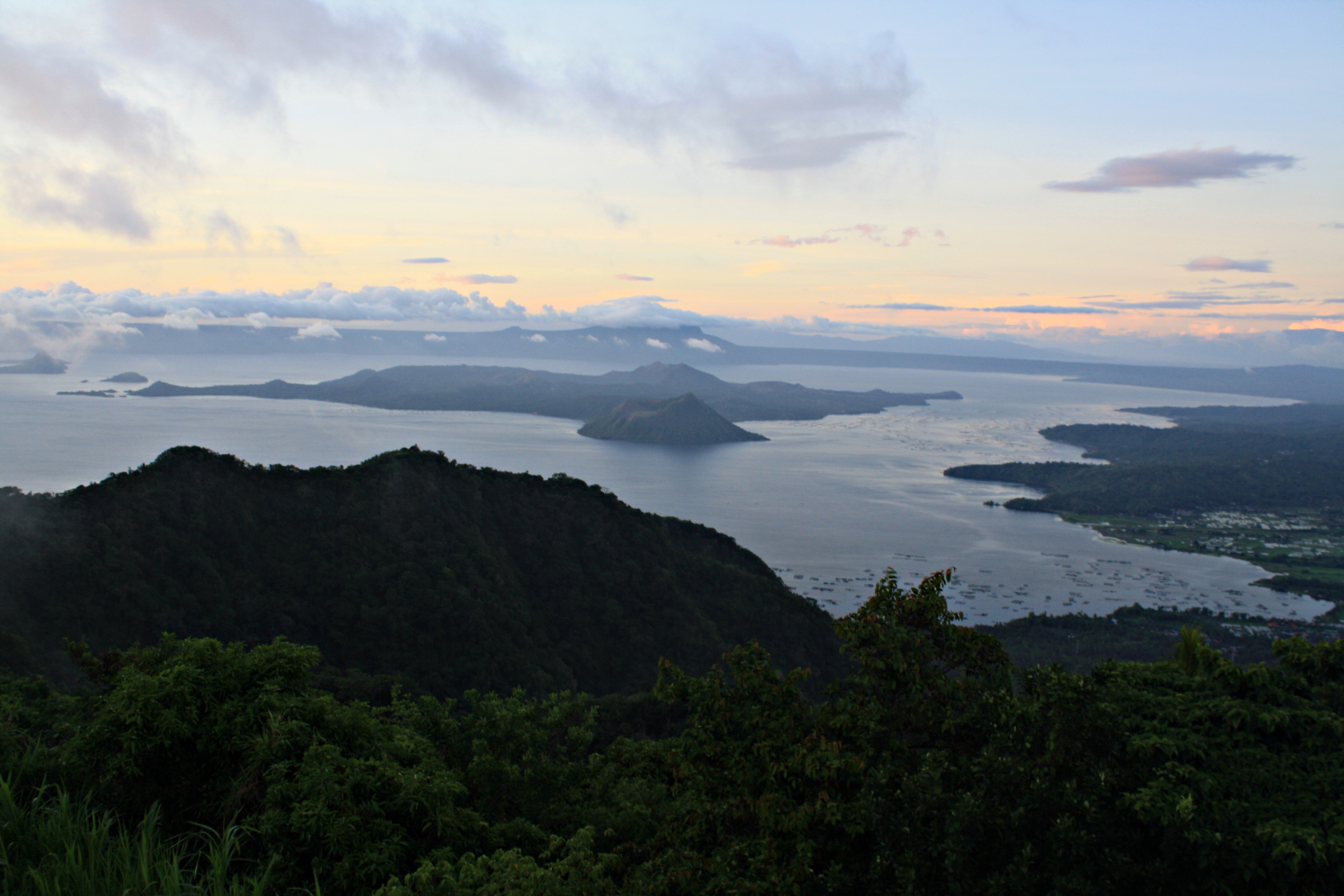
Taal Volcano provides a picturesque view from Tagaytay.

===== 2010 =====
On June 8, the PHIVOLCS raised the volcano status to Alert Level 2 (scale is 0–5, 0 referring to No Alert status), which indicates the volcano is undergoing magmatic intrusion, a precursor to an eruption. PHIVOLCS reminded the general public that the Main Crater was off-limits due to the possibility of hazardous steam-driven explosions and build-up of toxic gases. Areas with hot ground and steam emissions, such as portions of the Daang Kastila Trail, are considered hazardous. From May 11–24, Main Crater Lake's temperature increased by 2 to 3 K (3.6 to 5.4 °F). The composition of Main Crater Lake water has shown above normal values of MgCl, SO_{4}Cl, and Total Dissolved Solids. There has been ground steaming, accompanied by hissing sounds, on the northern and northeast sides of the main crater. On April 26, the volcanic seismicity was reported to have had increased.

===== 2011 =====
From April 9 to July 5, the alert level on Taal Volcano was raised from 1 to 2 because of the increased seismicity of Volcano Island. Frequency peaked at about 115 tremors on May 30 with a maximum intensity of IV, accompanied by rumbling sounds. Magma was intruding towards the surface, as indicated by continuing high rates of CO_{2} emissions in the Main Crater Lake and sustained seismic activity. Field measurements on May 24 showed that lake temperatures had increased slightly, pH values were slightly more acidic, and water levels were 4 cm (1.6 in) higher. A deformation survey conducted around Volcano Island from April 26 to May 3 showed that the volcano edifice had inflated slightly relative to the April 5–11 survey.

==== 2020 ====
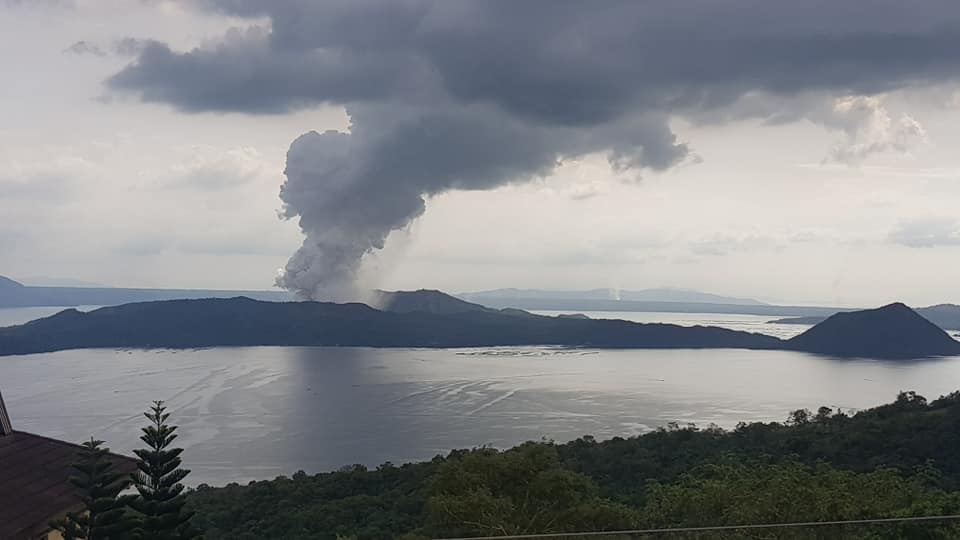
The January 12, 2020, eruption

The volcano erupted on the afternoon of January 12, with the alert level of the Philippine Institute of Volcanology and Seismology (PHIVOLCS) escalating from Alert Level 2 to Alert Level 4. It was a Plinian eruption from the main crater on Volcano Island. The eruption spewed bomb to lapilli sized scoria fragments along with ash to Calabarzon, Metro Manila, some parts of Central Luzon, and Pangasinan, in the Ilocos Region, which cancelled classes, work schedules, and flights. The rain of scoria and ash along with and volcanic thunderstorms were reported, and forced evacuations were made from the island. There were also warnings of a possible volcanic tsunami. The volcano produced volcanic lightning above its crater with ash clouds. The eruption progressed into a magmatic eruption, characterized by a lava fountain with thunder and lightning. By January 26, 2020, PHIVOLCS observed an inconsistent, but decreasing volcanic activity in Taal, prompting the agency to downgrade its warning to Alert Level 3. On February 14, PHIVOLCS downgraded the volcano's warning to Alert Level 2, due to consistent decreased volcanic activity. A total of 39 people died in the eruption, mostly because they refused to leave their homes or suffered health-related problems during the evacuation.

==== 2021 ====
Recorded IP cam of the eruption taken on July 1, 2021, by PHIVOLCS

In February, residents from Taal Volcano Island were preemptively evacuated due to the volcano's increasing activity. On March 9, 2021, PHIVOLCS raised the alert level from 1 to 2. In June, the volcano's emission of sulfur dioxide gas caused vog to appear over nearby provinces, and even Metro Manila. On July 1, the volcano erupted at around 3:16 p.m, and the alert level was raised from Alert Level 2 to Level 3. 19 weak phreatomagmatic bursts were recorded until July 9.

On July 23, PHIVOLCS lowered the alert level status from Alert Level 3 to Level 2.

==== 2022 ====
Between January 29 and 30, the volcano had nine phreatomagmatic bursts on its main crater. On March 26, PHIVOLCS raised the volcano's alert level status to Alert Level 3 due to a short lived-phreatomagmatic eruption with the evacuation of around 1,100 residents around the area and surrounding towns. Two phreatomagmatic events were recorded in which it emitted toxic plumes of 800 meters (2,600 ft) and 400 meters (1,300 ft). Locals have then reported an explosion near the crater around 1:00 PM (Philippine Time) with subsequent spurs of ashes around the lake. High level toxic emissions have been recorded as well as 14 volcanic earthquakes and 10 volcanic tremors within the day. The next day on March 27, volcanic activities were relatively tranquil with almost no recorded earthquakes although sulfur dioxide emission still measured at 1,140 tons. The National Disaster Risk Reduction and Management Council (NDRRMC) estimated that some 3,850 individuals were displaced on Monday, March 28. On April 9, PHIVOLCS downgraded again the alert level status from Level 3 to Level 2. It was then downgraded further to Alert Level 1 after around three months on July 11.

On August 3, PHILVOLCS recorded a low-level unrest of the volcano with the increase of sulfur dioxide (SO_{2}) emission. Abnormal spike of sulfur in the atmosphere was measured up to 12,125 tons that day. For comparison, daily and usual sulfur dioxide emission was measured up to 4,952 tons since July 15. Volcanic smog, or vog, and toxic gases were largely observed in Batangas and surrounding towns since August 2.

==== 2023 ====
In June, sulfur dioxide levels around the volcano massively increased, causing a vog that forced the suspension of classes in Laurel and Talisay, as well as in parts of Agoncillo. On June 29, PHIVOLCS recorded a phreatic burst that lasted for one minute and eight seconds. In mid September, the volcano again released vog that also forced the suspension of classes not only in Batangas but in neighboring cities and provinces as well. Vog was released at an average of 3,402 tonnes (3,348 long tons; 3,750 short tons) per day.

==== 2024 ====
In June, five volcanic earthquakes were reported, causing a series of phreatic eruptions in a 24-hour period, releasing 10,042.45 metric tons (9,883.84 long tons; 11,069.91 short tons) of sulfur dioxide into the atmosphere. Taal Volcano was under Alert Level 1 during September when several minor eruptions occurred.

On October 2, another series of minor phreatic eruptions were reported, lasting between two or six minutes. The volcano then underwent a phreatomagmatic eruption, emitting a plume that reached a height of 2,400 meters (7,900 ft), though the Alert Level 1 status remains unchanged. Another minor phreatomagmatic eruption occurred on October 5 and 10.

Two more phreatic eruptions were reported on October 16.

On December 3, a minor phreatomagmatic eruption was reported at 5:58 am, producing a grayish plume reaching 2,800 meters (9,200 ft).

==== 2025 ====
A phreatic eruption occurred on May 29, followed by a minor phreatomagmatic eruption on July 17. Another phreatic eruption occurred on September 11, while two minor eruptions occurred on October 1. A phreatic eruption occurred on October 13, followed by a minor phreatomagmatic eruption on October 20. Three minor eruptions occurred on October 26, while minor phreatomagmatic eruptions occurred on November 12 and November 23. Two minor eruptions occurred on December 4. Another minor phreatomagmatic eruption occurred on December 26. It produced ash jets and plumes that soon rose up to 600 meters before drifting to the southwest.

==== 2026 ====
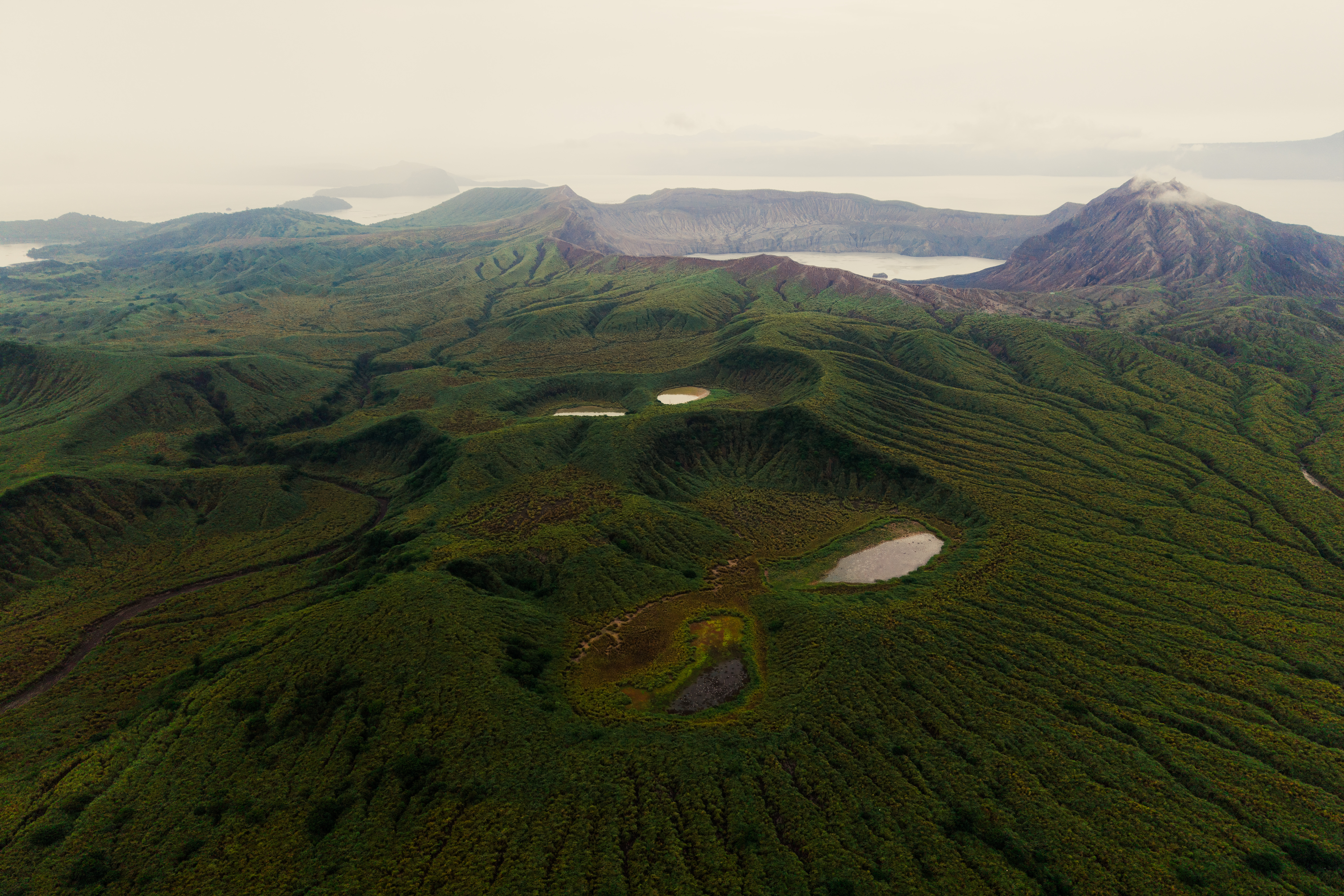
Aerial view of Taal Volcano in July, 2026

A small phreatomagmatic eruption occurred on January 9. Another minor phreatomagmatic eruption occurred on October 8, prompting the evacuation of at least 28 families in Agoncillo.

==== Eruption summary ====
Known eruptions since the one that resulted in the Pasong Fluidal Juvenile Bomb-Rich Ignimbrite Formation.

Summary of confirmed eruptions
Start Date	End Date	VEI	Comment
April 12, 2024		2	Continuing activity since
October 5, 2022	October 29, 2022	1	
April 1, 2021	November 15, 2022	2	
July 1, 2021	July 9, 2021	1	
January 12, 2020	January 22, 2020	4	
October 3, 1977	November 12, 1977	2	End date indefinite.
September 3, 1976	October 17, 1976	2	
November 9, 1970	November 13, 1970	1	
October 29, 1969	December 10, 1969	2	
January 31, 1968	April 2, 1968	2	
August 16, 1967	August 19, 1967	1	
July 5, 1966	August 4, 1966	3	
September 25, 1965	September 30, 1965	4	Resulted in 235 deaths.
January 27, 1911	February 8, 1911	3	Resulted in 1335 deaths.
April 16, 1904	July 15, 1904	1	Commenced ± 15 days and ended ± 5 days of dates given. New crater formed.
April 16, 1903	-	2	Commenced ± 15 days
November 12, 1878	November 15, 1878	2	Start may have been end of October 1878.
July 19, 1874	-	2	Killed livestock.
July 2, 1873	-	2	Commenced ± 182 days.
July 2, 1842	-	2	Commenced ± 182 days.
July 2, 1825	-	2	Commenced ± 182 days.
February 16, 1808	April 16, 1808	2	Commenced and ended ± 15 days of dates given. Ash to depth 84 cm (33 in).
1790	-	2	Sometime during year.
May 15, 1754	December 4, 1754	5	Resulted in 12 deaths. Large eruption on June 2, 1754, and largest on November 28, 1754.
August 11, 1749	September 1749	4	Day eruption started well described. End uncertain.
1731	-	2	Sometime during year. Eruption well described.
1729	-	2	Sometime during year.
September 24, 1716	September 27, 1716	4	Fishlife in lake killed.
1715	-	2	Sometime during year.
1709	-	2	Sometime during year.
1707	-	2	Sometime during year.
1645	-	0	Sometime during year. May have been solfataric or hydrothermal activity, or up to VTE 3 event.
1641	-	3	Sometime during year.
1635	-	0	Sometime during year. May have been solfataric or hydrothermal activity, or up to VTE 3 event.
1634	-	0	Sometime during year. May have been solfataric or hydrothermal activity, or up to VTE 3 event.
1608	-	0	Sometime with 3 years with uncertain eruption size and uncertainty as to whether eruption actually occurred rather than just seismic swarms. Had been assigned a VTE of 2.
1591	-	3	Sometime during year.
1572	-	3	Sometime during year.
1572	-	3	Sometime during year.
-	-	4	Alaminos Units.
-	-	6	Buco Ignimbrite and Tuff Formation.
-	-	6	Balagbag Ignimbrite Formation.
-	-	6	Burol Ignimbrite Formation.
3580 BCE	-	7	Pasong Fluidal Juvenile Bomb-Rich Ignimbrite Formation, constrained to between 6680 ± 310 years BP and 5380 ± 70 years BP.

== Wildfires ==
On May 6, 2024, Batangas governor Hermilando Mandanas declared Volcano Island a "no man's land" due to series of wildfire devastation on its southwest tip on May 2, near the Binintiang Munti observation station.

A grassfire broke out on April 2, 2025. It was eventually put out 21 hours later.

== Activity monitoring ==
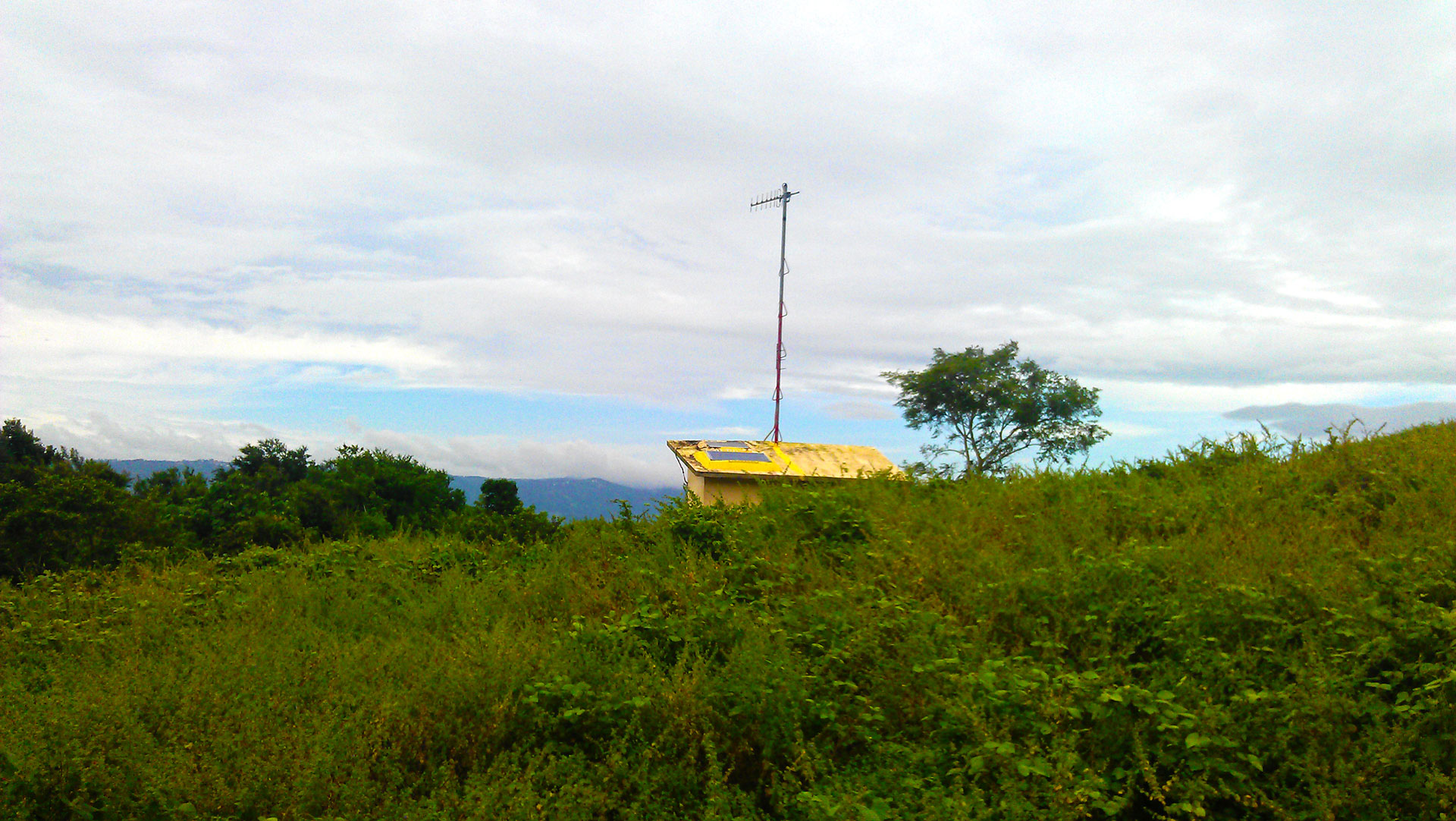
A solar-powered remote monitoring station located at Taal Volcano island

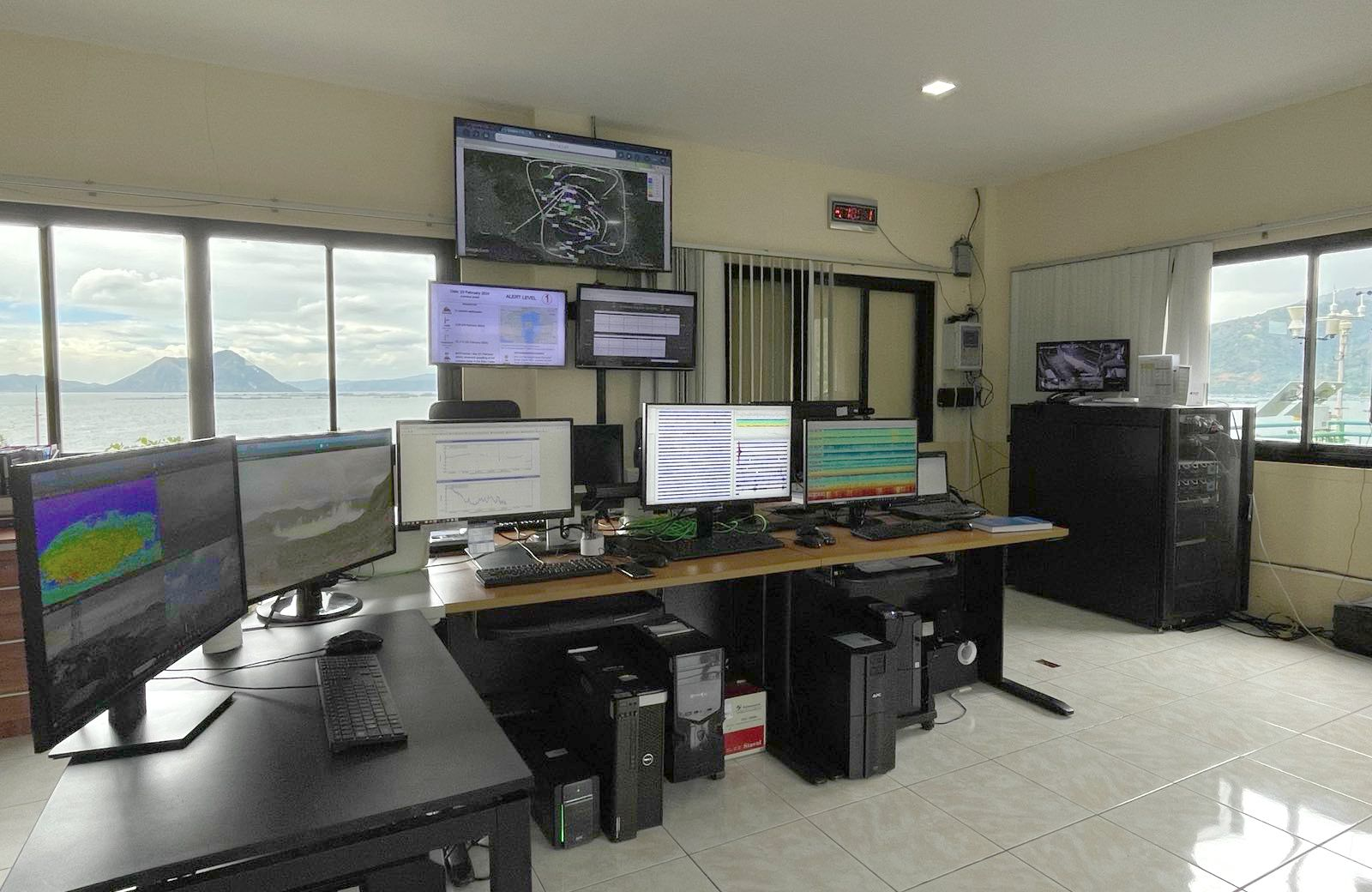
Taal Volcano Observatory’s Data Receiving Center acquires real-time digital multi-parameter volcano monitoring data streams from remote observation stations installed around the Volcano Island and Taal Caldera.

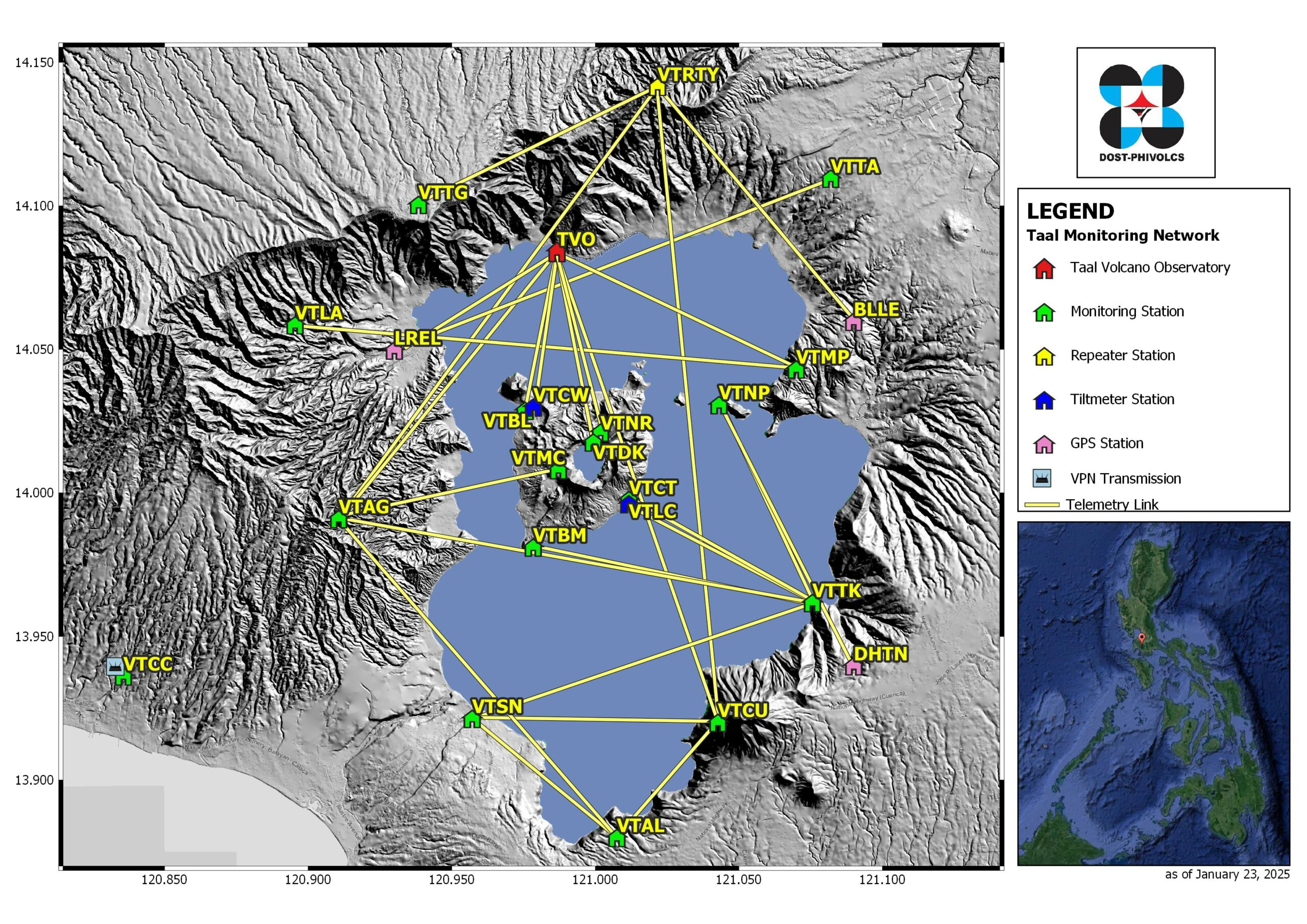
Taal Volcano Monitoring Network map

=== Alert levels ===
PHIVOLCS maintains a distinct Alert Level system for six volcanoes in the Philippines, including Taal Volcano. There are six levels in the system, numbered 0 to 5.

Taal Volcano Alert Level Scheme
Alert Level (step-up)	Criteria	Interpretation	Recommendation
0 (Normal)	Background parameters: Volcanic earthquakes typically <5/day; Main Crater Lake gas (diffuse CO_{2}) emission within 1,000 tonnes/day, average water temperature < 35 °C and acidity >pH2.5; General stationary or deflationary trends in ground deformation.	Quiescence; no major eruption in foreseeable future, but steam-driven and gas eruptions can occur without warning.	Permanent habitation on Taal Volcano Island (TVI) must not be allowed.
1 (Low-level unrest)	Abnormal parameters: Moderate level of seismic activity with some felt events; Main Crater Lake gas (diffuse CO_{2}) emission >1,000 tonnes/day, slight increases in fumarole and/or Main Crater Lake temperatures and acidity; Slight and/or localized inflationary ground deformation changes in TVI.	Hydrothermal or tectonic activity beneath the volcano may be occurring; steam-driven, gas or hydrothermal explosions can occur without warning.	Entry into the TVI Main Crater, the Daang Kastila fissure area and the Mt. Tabaro eruption site must not be allowed.
2 (Increasing unrest)	Increasing changes in parameters: Elevated level of seismic activity with some felt events in TVI and Taal Caldera (TC); Occurrence of earthquake swarms and low-frequency events; Sustained increases in inflationary ground deformation including ground tilt in TVI; Slight positive microgravity changes in TVI and TC; Increasing fumarole temperature and acidity and upwelling in the Main Crater Lake; Significant increases in CO_{2} emission, instrumental detection of airborne SO2 >500 tonnes/day.	Shallow hydrothermal unrest and/or deep-seated magmatic intrusion may be occurring, bringing higher chances of steam-driven, gas or hydrothermal explosions.	Entry into TVI must not be allowed. Communities in pre-defined areas of the highest hazard must ready for possible evacuation.
3 (Intensified unrest/Magmatic unrest)	Intensifying changes in parameters: Sudden increase or decline in seismic activity; Perceptible earthquakes, occurrence of swarms of volcano-tectonic and/or hybrid earthquakes; Elevating SO2 flux; Significant changes in Main Crater Lake temperature and/or acidity; Accelerating increase in ground inflation, rapid increase in ground tilt in TVI; Precursory phreatic or weak phreatomagmatic eruptions commence.	Magmatic or explosive phreatomagmatic eruption is imminent; precursory eruptive activity may be taking place and generating ashfall, ballistics and/or short lava flows.	TVI, Taal Lake and pre-defined lakeshore communities of Batangas facing the active vent must be evacuated.
4 (Hazardous eruption imminent)	Accelerating changes or abrupt decline in parameters: Rapidly intensifying volcanic earthquakes, continuous volcanic tremor, frequent felt earthquakes; Profuse degassing or ash explosions along existing or new vents and fissures; Elevated and/or sudden drop in SO2 flux; Accelerating increase or reversal of ground deformation patterns and ground fissuring; Explosive eruption or lava effusion with or without volcanic lightning commence.	Strong phreatomagmatic or magmatic eruption is taking place, which may or may not lead to violently explosive eruption. Widespread ashfall and ballistics, lava flows and minor pyroclastic density currents (PDCs) on TVI may be generated.	Communities in pre-determined worst-case or scenario-based volcanic hazards zones must be evacuated
5 (Highly hazardous eruption in progress)	Violently explosive magmatic eruption ongoing: Continuous intense seismic activity, including explosion-type volcanic earthquakes and strong felt events; Sustained tall eruption column with expansive umbrella cloud accompanied by loud booming sounds and volcanic lightning; Generation of PDCs/base surges and volcanic tsunami that transport across Taal Lake and lakeshore towns; Ground fissuring and large-particle tephra fall impacting lakeside communities and ashfall impacting farther areas.	Plinian/ Subplinian/ Violent phreatomagmatic eruption is taking place. Extreme life-threatening hazards of base surges/PDCs, volcanic tsunami, thick tephra fall/ashfall, fissuring, lahars and landslides could impact communities around the lake and downwind of the eruption plume.	Additional areas for evacuation should be considered based on prevailing conditions.

=== Eruption precursors at Taal ===
- Increase in frequency of volcanic quakes with occasional seismic events accompanied by rumbling sounds.
- On the Main Crater Lake, changes in the water temperature, level, and bubbling or boiling activity on the lake. Before the 1965 eruption began, the lake's temperature rose by about 15 °C (27 °F) above normal. However, with some eruptions, there is no reported increase in the lake's temperature.
- Development of new or reactivation of old thermal areas like fumaroles, geysers or mudpots.
- Ground inflation or ground fissuring.
- Increase in temperature of ground probe holes on monitoring stations.
- Strong sulfuric odor or irritating fumes similar to rotten eggs.
- Fish dieoffs and the drying up of vegetation.

==== Other possible precursors ====
Volcanologists measuring the concentration of radon gas in the soil on Volcano Island measured an anomalous increase of radon concentration by a factor of six in October 1994. This increase was followed 22 days later by the magnitude 7.1 Mindoro earthquake on November 15, centered about 50 kilometres (31 miles) south of Taal, off the coast of Luzon. A typhoon had passed through the area a few days before the radon spike was measured, but when Typhoon Angela, one of the most powerful to strike the area in ten years, crossed Luzon on almost the same track a year later, no radon spike was measured. Typhoons, therefore, were ruled out as the cause, and strong evidence suggests that the radon originated in the stress accumulation before the earthquake.

== See also ==
- List of volcanoes in the Philippines
  - List of active volcanoes in the Philippines
  - List of potentially active volcanoes in the Philippines
  - List of inactive volcanoes in the Philippines
