= Cavendish (crater) =

Lunar impact crater

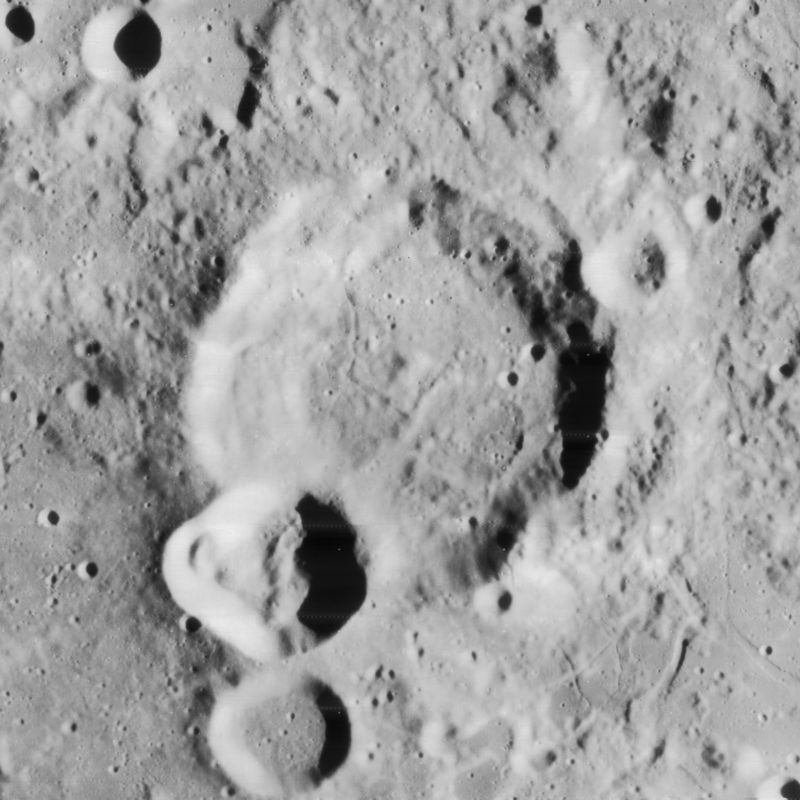
- Cavendish crater image
- Coordinates: 24.5°S 53.7°W
- Diameter: 52.64 km (32.71 mi)
- Depth: 2.4 km (1.5 mi)
- Colongitude: 54° at sunrise
- Eponym: Henry Cavendish

Cavendish is a lunar impact crater that is located in the southwest part of the Moon, to the southwest of the larger crater Mersenius. It lies between the smaller craters Henry to the west-northwest and de Gasparis to the east-southeast.

The rim of Cavendish is heavily worn and the crater Cavendish E lies across the southwest rim. The smaller Cavendish A is intruding into the northeast rim. On the floor appear a pair of ruined craters that are joined at their low rims and span most of the central Cavendish crater floor from east to west.

A rille from the Rimae de Gasparis reaches the eastern rim of Cavendish.

The crater only has one report of a transient lunar phenomenon. On January 24, 1965, two observers independently reported intermittent flashes coming from the west wall, which at the time was just inside the terminator. The pattern began with a bright glare that continued for three minutes. The flashing then continued for over 20 hours before fading.

This crater is named after English chemist and physicist Henry Cavendish (1731–1810), who is known for his discovery of hydrogen. His name was added to lunar nomenclature by German astronomer J. H. von Mädler in 1834. The designation was made official when it was adopted by the International Astronomical Union in 1935.

== Satellite craters ==
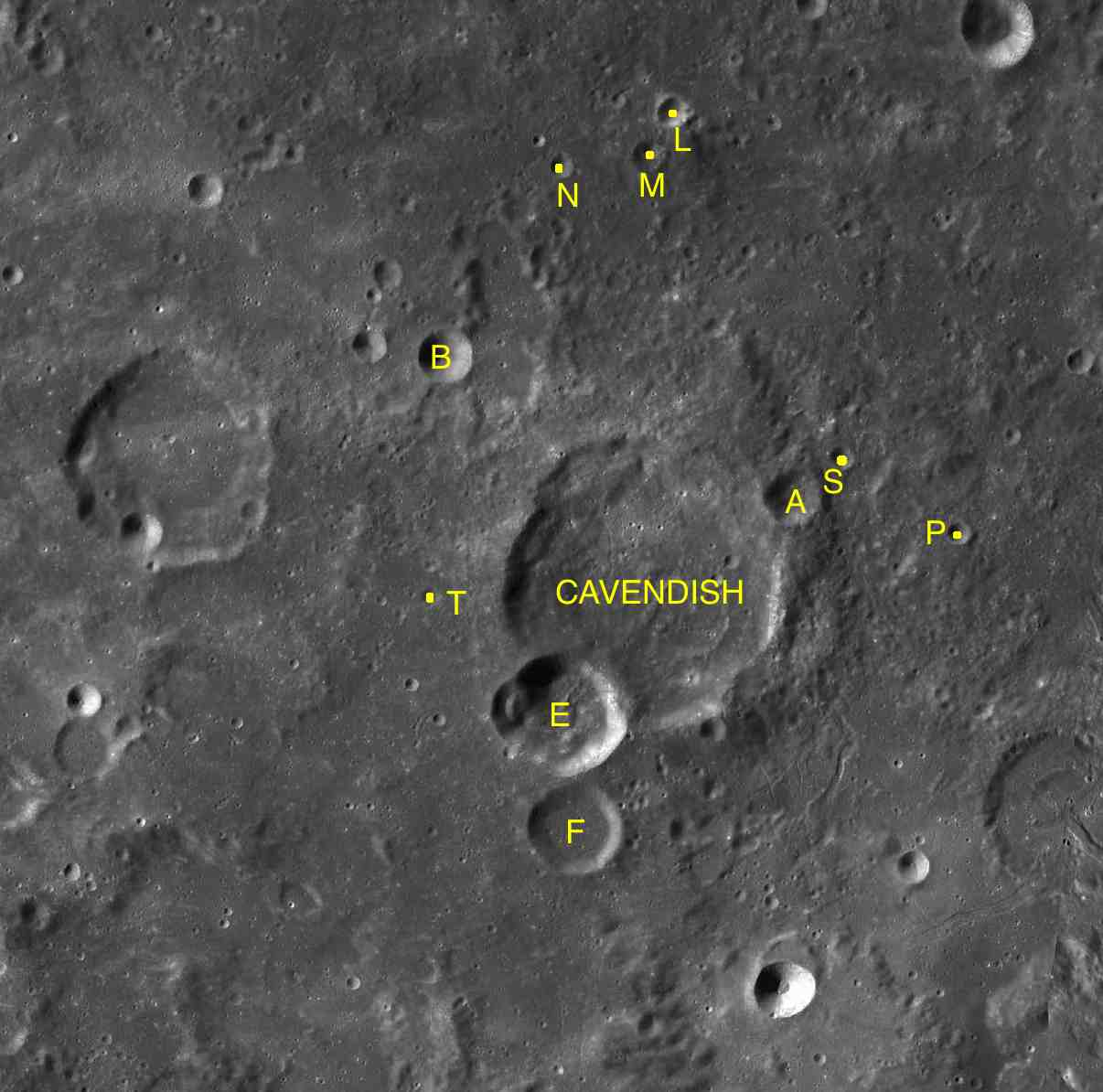
Satellite features of Cavendish

By convention these features are identified on lunar maps by placing the letter on the side of the crater midpoint that is closest to Cavendish.

Cavendish	Latitude	Longitude	Diameter
A	24.0° S	52.7° W	10 km
B	23.2° S	55.1° W	10 km
E	25.4° S	54.2° W	24 km
F	26.1° S	54.0° W	18 km
L	21.7° S	53.6° W	5 km
M	22.0° S	53.8° W	6 km
N	22.1° S	54.3° W	4 km
P	24.2° S	51.6° W	4 km
S	23.8° S	52.4° W	5 km
T	24.8° S	55.2° W	4 km
