= Luigi Palmieri =

Italian physicist and meteorologist (1807–1896)

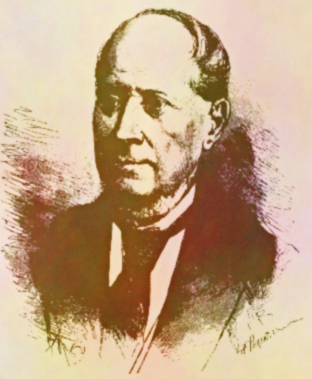
- Luigi Palmieri
- Born: 22 April 1807; Faicchio, Benevento
- Died: 9 September 1896 (aged 89); Naples, Italy
- Scientific career
- Fields: Physics; meteorology

Luigi Palmieri (22 April 1807 – 9 September 1896) was an Italian physicist and meteorologist. He was famous for his scientific studies of the eruptions of Mount Vesuvius, for his research on earthquakes and meteorological phenomena and for improving the seismograph of the time.

== Biography ==
Palmieri was born in Faicchio, Benevento, Italy and died in Naples, Italy at the age of 89.

Palmieri received a degree in physics from the University of Naples. In 1845, he was made Professor of Physics at the Royal Naval School in Naples and in 1847 was appointed as Chair of Physics at the university. In 1848, he began working at the Vesuvius Observatory and in 1854 was appointed as Director of the Observatory. Using an electromagnetic seismometer for the detection and measurement of ground tremors, Palmieri was able to detect very slight movements in trying to predict volcanic eruptions. Furthermore, he was the first to detect the presence of Helium on Earth in the lava of Mount Vesuvius.

Using a modified Peltier electrometer, he also carried out research in the field of atmospheric electricity. Other scientific contributions included the development of a modified Morse telegraph, and improvements to the anemometer and pluviometer.

Biography

- Royal Society of Naples (Academy of Sciences) – 1861
- Academy of the Lincei (Florence) – 1871
- American Philosophical Society (Philadelphia) -- 1873

== See also ==
- Helium

== Honours ==
- The crater Palmieri on the Moon
- Member of the Superior Council of Meteorology
- Senator of the London tower
- Grand Commander of the Order of the Crown of Italy
- Commander of the Order of Rosa del Brazile

== Publications ==
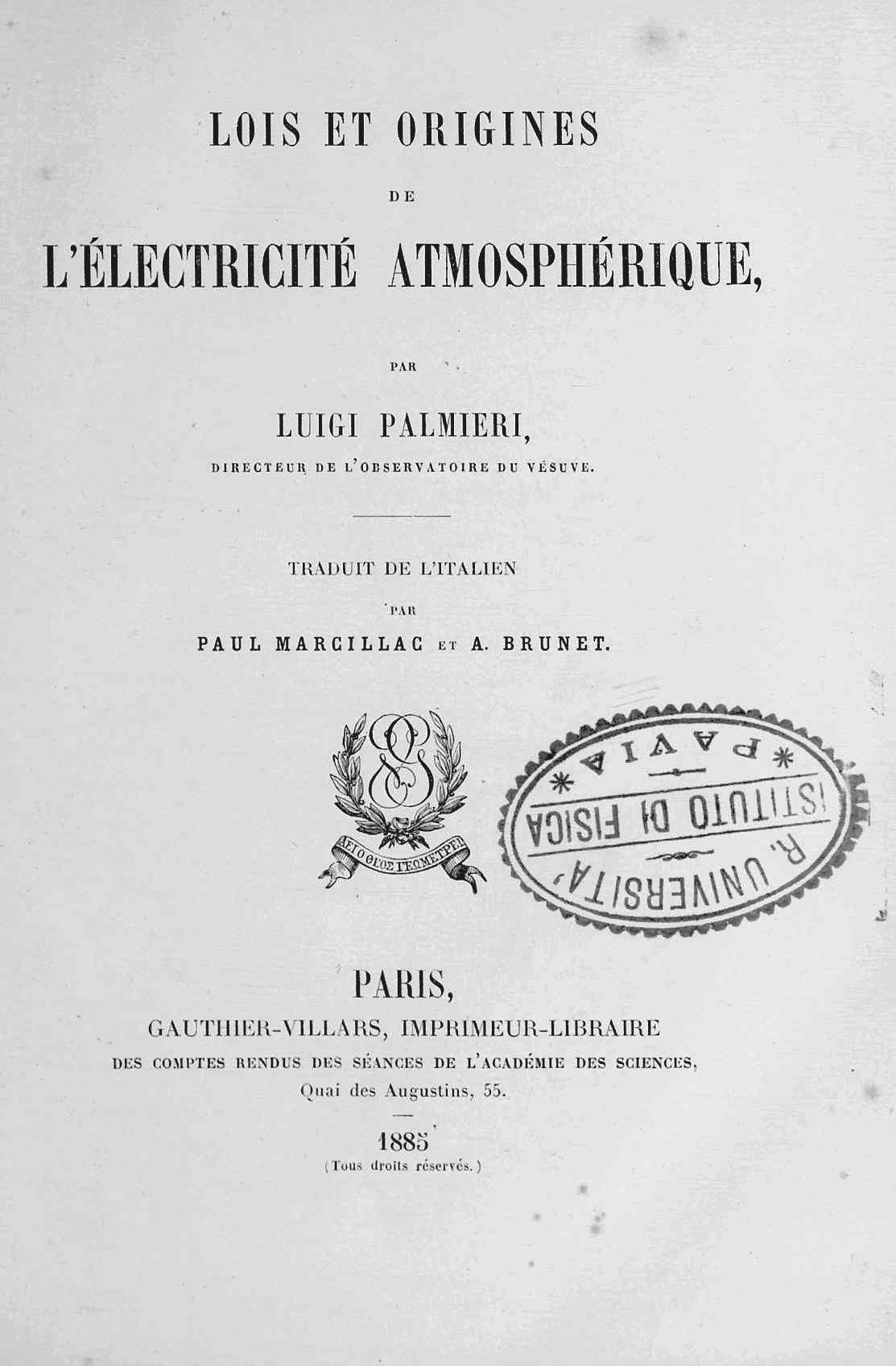
Leggi ed origine dell'elettricità atmosferica, 1885

- "Annali dell' osservatorio Vesuviano". 1859–1873.
- "Incendio Vesuviano del 26 Aprile 1872". Naples, 1872. (Ger.: Berlin, 1872)
- "Il Vesuvio e la sua storia". Milan, 1880.
- "Nuove lezioni di fisica sperimentale e di fisica terrestre". Naples, 1883.
- "Die Atmospharische Elektrizität". Vienna, 1884.
- "Les lois et les origines de l'électricité". Paris, 1885.
- Leggi ed origine dell'elettricità atmosferica (in French). Paris: Gauthier-Villars. 1885.
