= Fourier (crater) =

Lunar impact crater

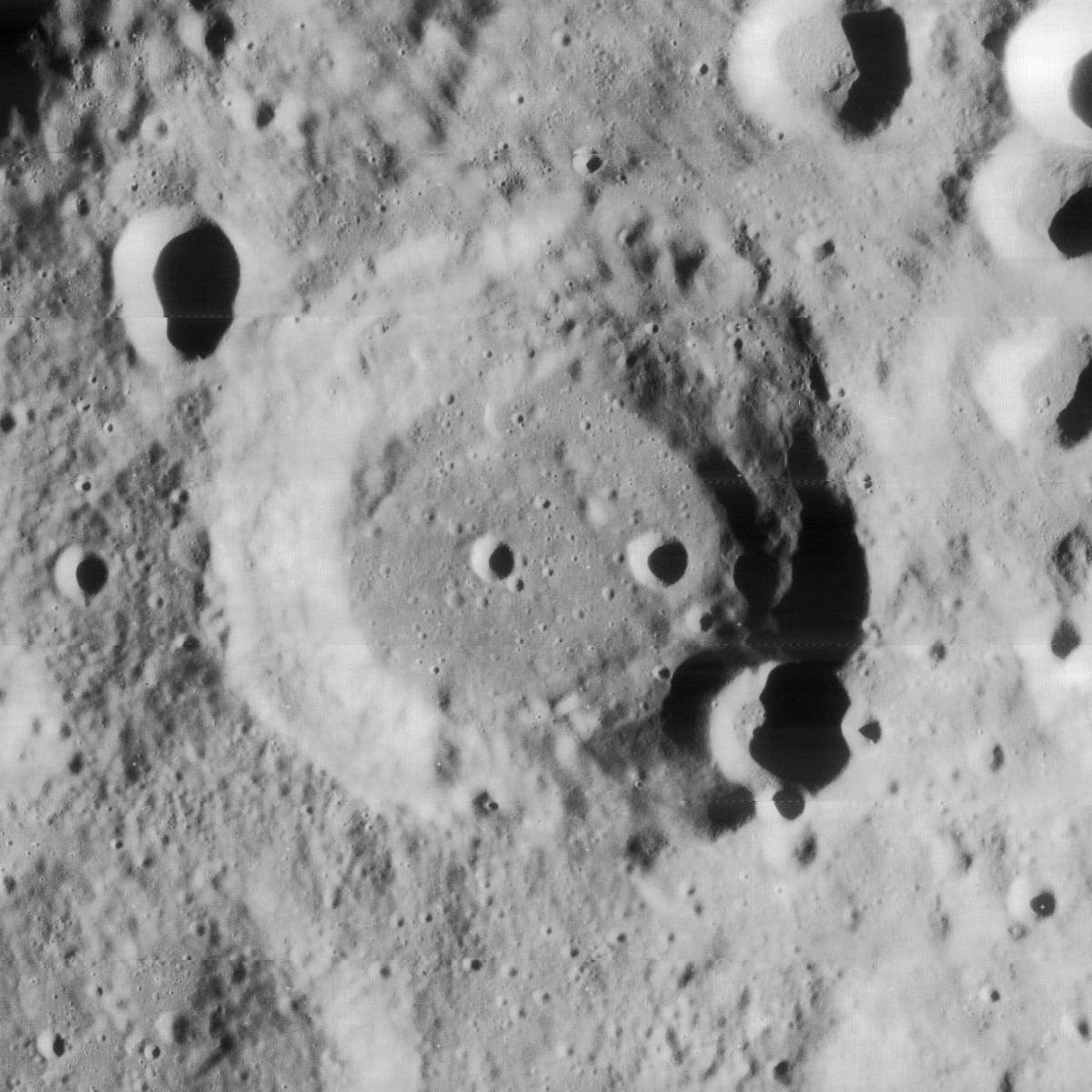
- Lunar Orbiter 4 image (black lines are artifact of image reprocessing)
- Coordinates: 30.3°S 53.0°W
- Diameter: 51.57 km (32.04 mi)
- Depth: 3.7 km (2.3 mi)
- Colongitude: 54° at sunrise
- Eponym: Jean-B. J. Fourier

Fourier is a lunar impact crater that is located in the southwestern part of the Moon's near side, just to the southeast of the crater Vieta. To the northeast is the Mare Humorum. The rim of this crater is roughly circular, but appears oval when viewed from the Earth due to foreshortening.

Except to the north-northwest, the outer rim is not heavily eroded. The satellite crater Fourier B lies along the eastern rim and inner side. The inner wall is relatively wide, and is slumped slightly along the edge forming a shelf near the perimeter. The infrared spectrum of pure crystalline plagioclase has been identified on the southeast wall. The interior floor is just over half the diameter of the crater rim, and is relatively level with a small crater to the west of the midpoint and another near the northeast edge.

Just to the south of Fourier is a dome with a teardrop shape and a small crater at the summit.

This formation is named after French mathematician Jean Baptiste Joseph Fourier (1768-1830). His name was incorporated into the lunar nomenclature of German astronomer Johann H. Mädler in 1837. Its designation was formally adopted by the International Astronomical Union in 1935.

== Satellite craters ==
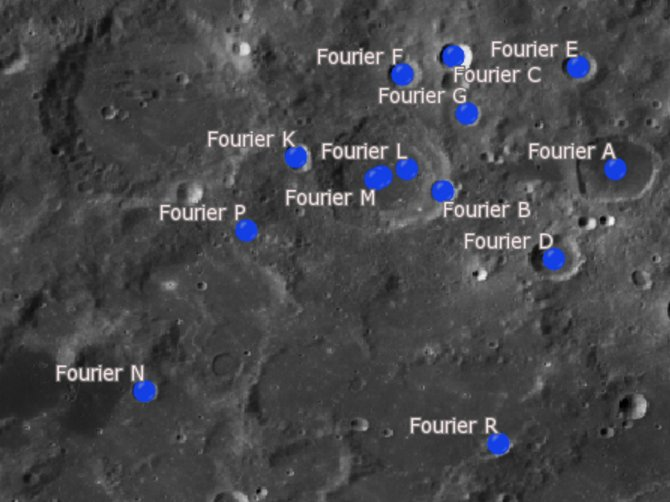
Fourier satellite features and surroundings

By convention these features are identified on lunar maps by placing the letter on the side of the crater midpoint that is closest to Fourier.

Fourier	Latitude	Longitude	Diameter
A	30.2° S	49.5° W	32 km
B	30.5° S	52.0° W	11 km
C	28.5° S	51.9° W	14 km
D	31.5° S	50.4° W	21 km
E	28.7° S	50.1° W	14 km
F	28.8° S	52.7° W	14 km
G	29.4° S	51.7° W	11 km
K	30.0° S	54.2° W	10 km
L	30.2° S	52.6° W	5 km
M	30.4° S	53.1° W	4 km
N	33.5° S	56.4° W	10 km
P	31.0° S	54.9° W	9 km
R	34.2° S	51.2° W	9 km

Satellite crater Fourier A has been flooded with basaltic lava and includes several low domes of volcanic origin.

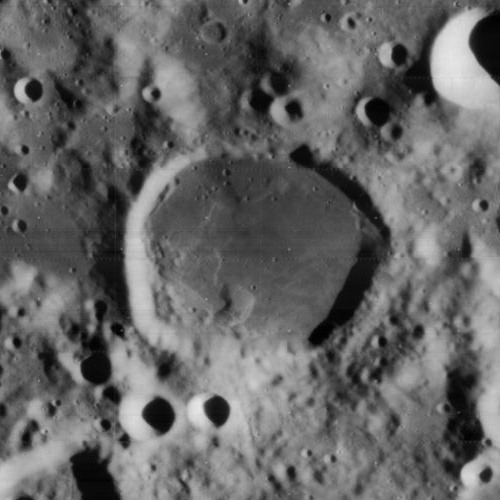
Fourier A
