= De Gasparis (crater) =

Crater on the Moon

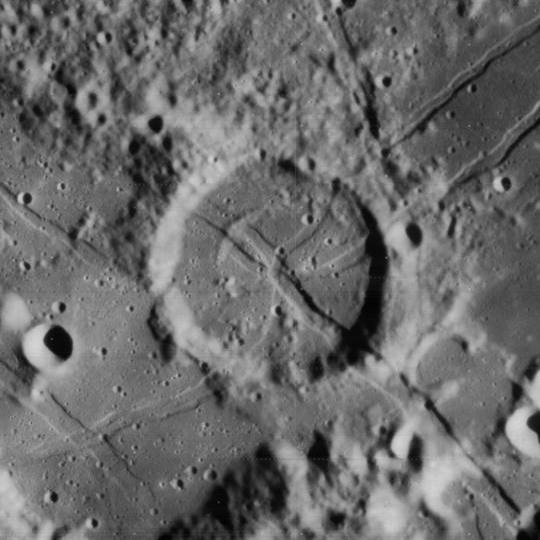
- Lunar Orbiter 4 image
- Coordinates: 25.9°S 50.7°W
- Diameter: 30.90 km (19.20 mi)
- Depth: None
- Colongitude: 51° at sunrise
- Eponym: Annibale de Gasparis

de Gasparis is a lunar crater that is located in the southwest part of the Moon. It lies to the southeast of the crater Cavendish and south of Mersenius. The rim of de Gasparis is worn and eroded, and the interior has been flooded by basaltic lava. The surviving outer rim reaches a maximum altitude of about 0.8 km.

This crater is notable for the formation of rilles that criss-cross the floor and the surrounding surface. This system of clefts in the surface is designated Rimae de Gasparis, and they span an area of about 47 km (29 mi) in diameter. The rilles are thought to have been created due to tectonic faults deep below the surface. As they cut across de Gasparis, this indicates that they were formed after the crater. They date to the Eratosthenian period of the lunar geologic timescale, while the floor is from the Imbrian.

This formation is named after Italian astronomer Annibale de Gasparis (1819-1892). His name was included in the lunar nomenclature of German astronomer Johann F. J. Schmidt during the 19th century. Its designation was officially adopted by the International Astronomical Union in 1935. The rimae were designated in 1964, after the crater.

== Satellite craters ==
By convention these features are identified on lunar maps by placing the letter on the side of the crater midpoint that is closest to de Gasparis.

de Gasparis	Latitude	Longitude	Diameter
A	26.7° S	51.3° W	37 km
B	27.0° S	52.5° W	12 km
C	26.3° S	51.7° W	6 km
D	25.7° S	50.1° W	4 km
E	26.4° S	49.4° W	7 km
F	26.3° S	49.3° W	8 km
G	27.0° S	49.3° W	6 km
