= Mersenius (crater) =

Crater on the Moon

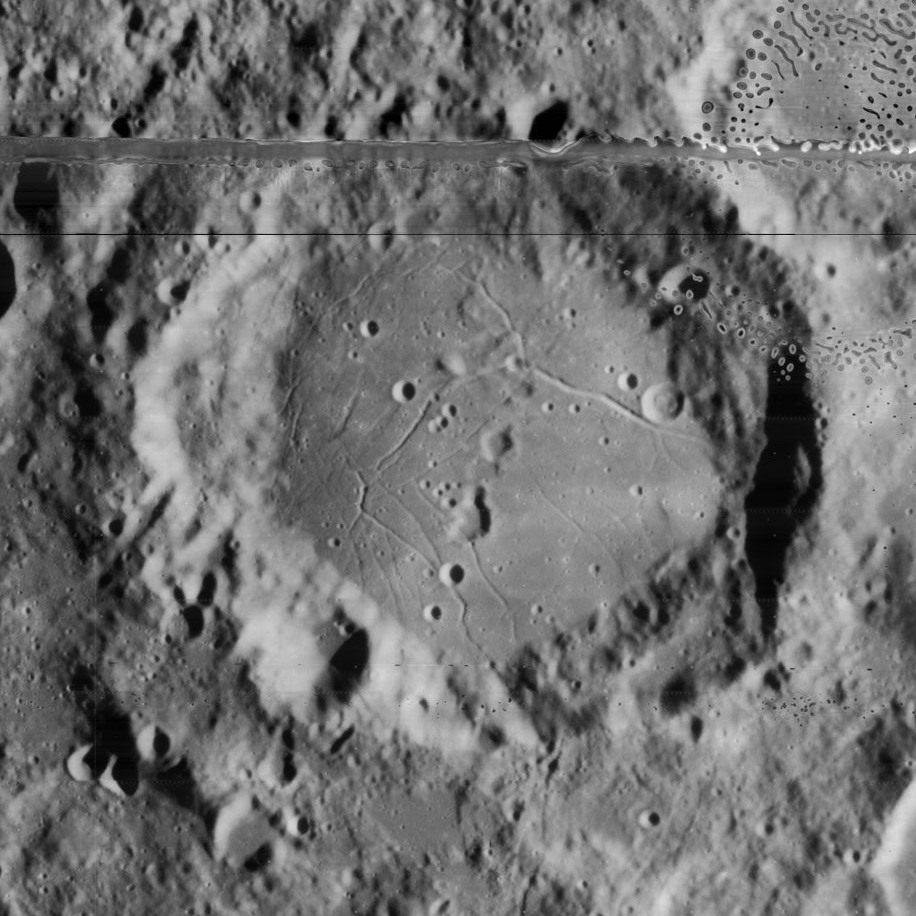
- Lunar Orbiter 4 image (band at top and spots to right are blemishes on original image)
- Coordinates: 21.49°S 49.34°W
- Diameter: 84.46 kilometres (52.48 mi)
- Depth: 2.3 km
- Colongitude: 48° at sunrise
- Formation: Nectarian
- Eponym: Marin Mersenne

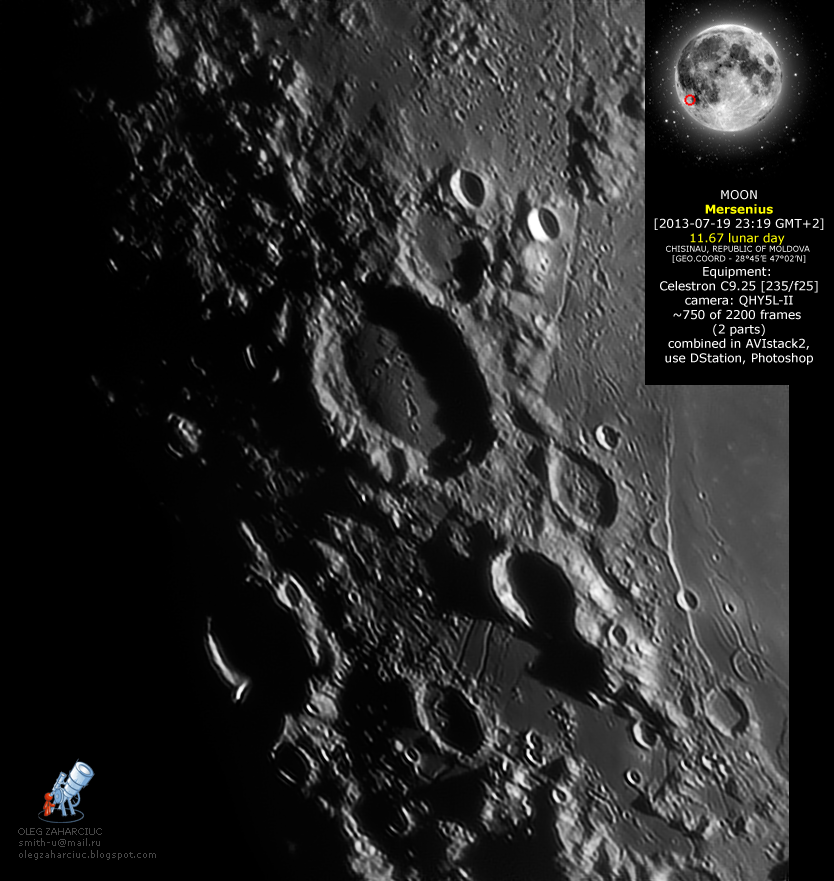
View of Mersenius from Earth [2013-07-19 23:19

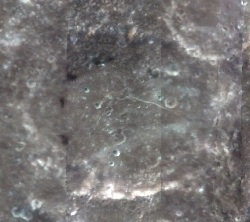
Clementine mosaic of Mersenius

Mersenius is a lunar impact crater that is located to the west of the Mare Humorum, in the southwestern part of the Moon. To the southwest is the crater Cavendish, and to the south-southeast lies Liebig. Mersenius is 84 kilometers in diameter and 2.3 kilometers deep. It is from the Nectarian period, 3.92 to 3.85 billion years ago.

The rim of Mersenius is heavily worn, especially in the low northern section. The crater Mersenius N lies across the southwestern rim. T. W. Webb noted "a convex interior, with several minute craters, hills, and clefts". The interior has been flooded by basaltic lava, which bulges upwards forming a convex domed shape with an estimated height of 450 metres relative to the floor edges. This was most likely formed by lava upwelling beneath the surface. There are several tiny craters across the floor surface, but little in the way of a central peak. At least two faint rilles lie along the surface of the floor.

To the east of the crater on the surface and edges of the Mare Humorum is a rille system designated Rimae Mersenius. These rilles are generally parallel and run to the north-northeast for a length of about 230 kilometers.

The crater was named after the 17th-century French mathematician and physicist Marin Mersenne (1588-1648). Its designation was formally adopted by the International Astronomical Union in 1935.

== Bright satellite craters Mersenius C and Gassendi E ==
During and after full moon, the bowl-shaped bright white looking satellite crater Mersenius C, northeast of Mersenius itself, creates with bright satellite crater Gassendi E, northeast of Mersenius C, a remarkable contrast phenomenon at the northwestern rim of the dark Mare Humorum. The brightness of both satellite craters Mersenius C and Gassendi E is also noticeable on the photographic version of chart LAC 93 (page 186) in The Clementine Atlas of the Moon (Ben Bussey / Paul D. Spudis).

== Satellite craters ==
By convention these features are identified on lunar maps by placing the letter on the side of the crater midpoint that is closest to Mersenius.

Mersenius	Latitude	Longitude	Diameter
B	21.0° S	51.6° W	15 km
C	19.8° S	45.9° W	14 km
D	23.1° S	46.8° W	34 km
E	22.5° S	46.0° W	10 km
H	22.5° S	49.9° W	15 km
J	21.0° S	52.8° W	5 km
K	21.2° S	50.7° W	5 km
L	19.9° S	48.4° W	3 km
M	21.2° S	48.3° W	5 km
N	22.1° S	49.2° W	3 km
P	19.9° S	47.8° W	42 km
R	19.3° S	47.6° W	4 km
S	19.2° S	46.9° W	16 km
U	23.0° S	50.0° W	4 km
V	22.9° S	50.5° W	5 km
W	23.0° S	50.8° W	5 km
X	22.4° S	47.9° W	4 km
Y	22.7° S	48.2° W	4 km
Z	21.0° S	50.6° W	3 km

Mersenius M is a concentric (double-walled) crater.
