= Woldemar Voigt =

German mathematician and physicist (1850–1919)

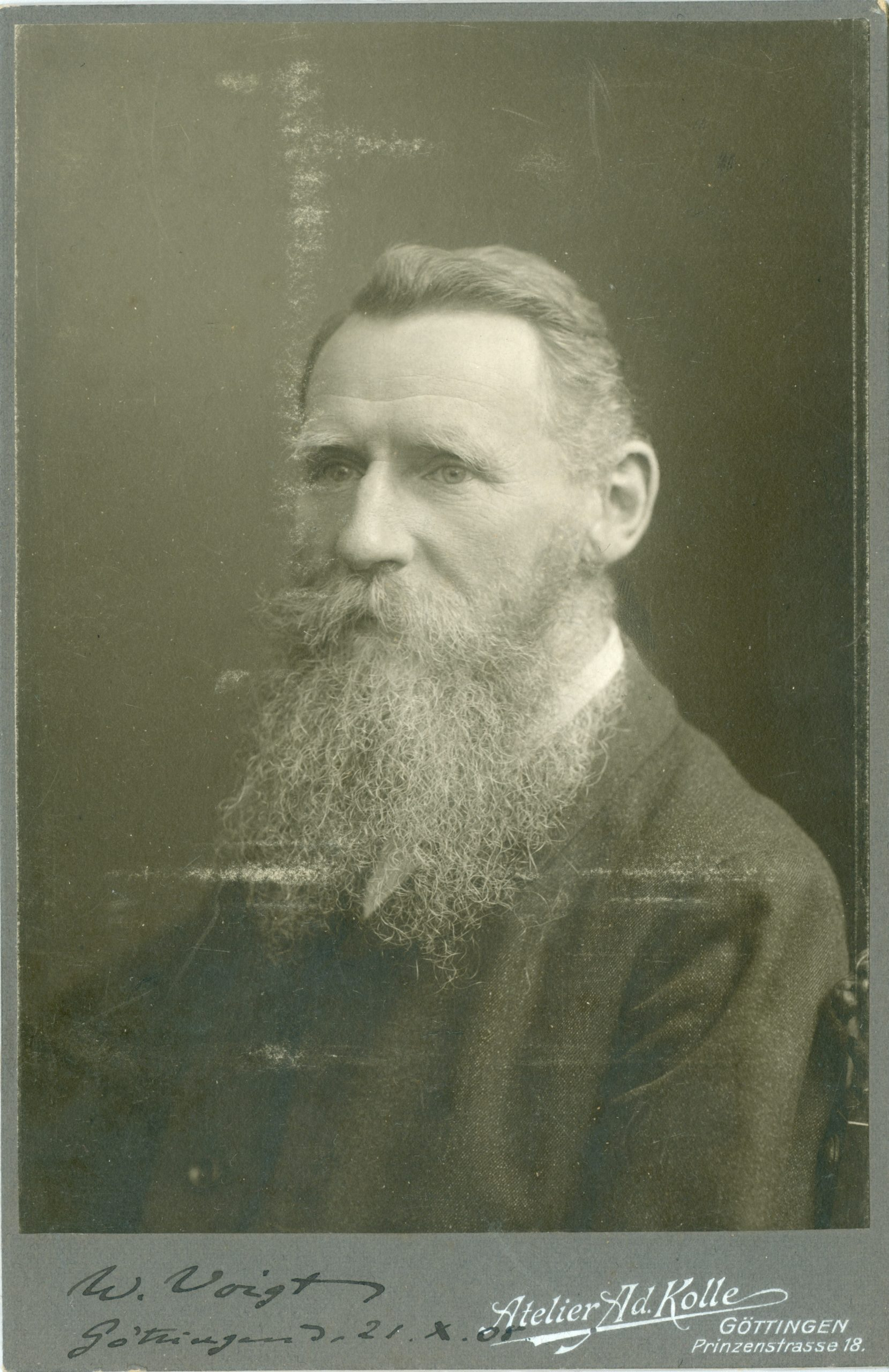
- Voigt, c. 1908
- Born: 2 September 1850; Leipzig, Kingdom of Saxony, German Confederation
- Died: 13 December 1919 (aged 69); Göttingen, Free State of Prussia, Weimar Republic
- Education: University of Königsberg
- Known for: Piezoelectricity; Pyroelectricity; Voigt effect; Voigt model; Voigt notation; Voigt profile; Voigt transformation; Voigt–Thomson law; Dyakonov–Voigt wave; Kelvin–Voigt material
- Awards: ForMemRS (1913)
- Scientific career
- Fields: Mathematics; physics
- Workplaces: University of Göttingen
- Doctoral advisor: Franz Ernst Neumann
- Doctoral students: Paul Drude (1887); Józef Wierusz-Kowalski (1889); Walther Ritz (1902); Alfred Robb (1904)

Woldemar Voigt (German: [foːkt]; 2 September 1850 – 13 December 1919) was a German mathematician and physicist.

== Biography ==
Voigt was born in Leipzig, and died in Göttingen. He was a student of Franz Ernst Neumann. Voigt taught at the Georg August University of Göttingen and eventually went on to head the Mathematical Physics Department there. He was succeeded in 1914 by Peter Debye, who took charge of the theoretical department of the Physical Institute.

Voigt worked on crystal physics, thermodynamics and electro-optics. His main work was the Lehrbuch der Kristallphysik (Textbook on crystal physics), first published in 1910. He discovered what is now called the Voigt effect in 1898. The word tensor in its current meaning was introduced by him in 1898. Voigt profile and Voigt notation are named after him. He was also an amateur musician and became known as a Bach expert (see External links). He was the first to suggest, in 1886, that Bach's Concerto for two harpsichords in C minor, BWV 1060 was originally scored for violin and oboe.

In 1887 Voigt formulated a form of the Lorentz transformation between a rest frame of reference and a frame moving with speed $v$ in the $x$ direction. However, as Voigt himself said, the transformation was aimed at a specific problem and did not carry with it the idea of a general coordinate transformation, as is the case in relativity theory.

== Voigt transformation ==
In modern notation Voigt's transformation was

$$x' = x - vt,$$
$$y' = y/\gamma,$$
$$z' = z/\gamma,$$
$$t' = t - vx/c^2,$$

where $\gamma = 1/\sqrt{1 - v^2/c^2}$. If the right-hand sides of his equations are multiplied by $\gamma$, they become the modern Lorentz transformation. Hermann Minkowski said in 1908 that the transformations which play the main role in the principle of relativity were first examined by Voigt in 1887. Also Hendrik Lorentz (1909) is on record as saying that he could have taken these transformations into his theory of electrodynamics, if only he had known of them, rather than developing his own. It is interesting then to examine the consequences of these transformations from this point of view. Lorentz might then have seen that the transformation introduced relativity of simultaneity, and also time dilation. However, the magnitude of the dilation was greater than the now accepted value in the Lorentz transformations. Moving clocks, obeying Voigt's time transformation, indicate an elapsed time $\Delta t_\text{Voigt} = \gamma^{-2} \Delta t = \gamma^{-1} \Delta t_\text{Lorentz}$, while stationary clocks indicate an elapsed time $\Delta t$.

== See also ==
- German inventors and discoverers
- Physical crystallography before X-rays
