= Kelvin–Helmholtz mechanism =

Process of energy release of a contracting star or planet

The Kelvin–Helmholtz mechanism is an astronomical process that occurs when the surface of a star or a planet cools. The cooling causes the internal pressure to drop, and the star or planet shrinks as a result. This compression, in turn, heats the core of the star/planet. This mechanism is evident on Jupiter and Saturn and on brown dwarfs whose central temperatures are not high enough to undergo hydrogen fusion. It is estimated that Jupiter radiates more energy through this mechanism than it receives from the Sun, but Saturn might not. Jupiter has been estimated to shrink at a rate of approximately 1 mm/year by this process, corresponding to an internal flux of 7.485 W/m^{2}.

The mechanism was originally proposed by Kelvin and Helmholtz in the late nineteenth century to explain the source of energy of the Sun. By the mid-nineteenth century, conservation of energy had been accepted, and one consequence of this law of physics is that the Sun must have some energy source to continue to shine. Because nuclear reactions were unknown, the main candidate for the source of solar energy was gravitational contraction.

However, it soon was recognized by Sir Arthur Eddington and others that the total amount of energy available through this mechanism only allowed the Sun to shine for millions of years rather than the billions of years that the geological and biological evidence suggested for the age of the Earth. (Kelvin himself had argued that the Earth was millions, not billions, of years old.) The true source of the Sun's energy remained uncertain until the 1930s, when it was shown by Hans Bethe to be nuclear fusion.

== Power generated by a Kelvin–Helmholtz contraction ==
It was theorised that the gravitational potential energy from the contraction of the Sun could be its source of power. To calculate the total amount of energy that would be released by the Sun in such a mechanism (assuming uniform density), it was approximated to a perfect sphere made up of concentric shells. The gravitational potential energy could then be found as the integral over all the shells from the centre to its outer radius.

Gravitational potential energy from Newtonian mechanics is defined as:

$$U = -\frac{Gm_1m_2}{r},$$

where G is the gravitational constant, and the two masses in this case are that of the thin shells of width dr, and the contained mass within radius r as one integrates between zero and the radius of the total sphere. This gives:

$$U = -G\int_0^R \frac{m(r) 4 \pi r^2 \rho}{r}\, dr,$$

where R is the outer radius of the sphere, and m(r) is the mass contained within the radius r. Changing m(r) into a product of volume and density to satisfy the integral,

$$U = -G\int_0^R \frac{4 \pi r^3 \rho 4 \pi r^2 \rho}{3r}\, dr = -\frac{16}{15}G \pi^2 \rho^2 R^5.$$

Recasting in terms of the mass of the sphere gives the total gravitational potential energy as

$$U = -\frac{3GM^2}{5R}.$$

According to the Virial Theorem, the total energy for gravitationally bound systems in equilibrium is one half of the time-averaged potential energy,

$$U_r = \frac{|\langle U \rangle|}{2} = \frac{3GM^2}{10R}.$$

While uniform density is not correct, one can get a rough order of magnitude estimate of the expected age of our star by inserting known values for the mass and radius of the Sun, and then dividing by the known luminosity of the Sun (note that this will involve another approximation, as the power output of the Sun has not always been constant):

$$\frac{U_\text{r}}{L_\odot} \approx \frac{1.1 \times 10^{41}~\text{J}}{3.828 \times 10^{26}~\text{W}} = 2.874\times10^{14}~\mathrm{s} \, \approx 8\,900\,000~\text{years},$$

where $L_\odot$ is the luminosity of the Sun. While giving enough power for considerably longer than many other physical methods, such as chemical energy, this value was clearly still not long enough due to geological and biological evidence that the Earth was billions of years old. It was eventually discovered that thermonuclear energy was responsible for the power output and long lifetimes of stars.

The flux of internal heat for Jupiter is given by the derivative according to the time of the total energy

$$\frac{dU_r}{dt} = \frac{-3GM^2}{10R^2} \frac{dR}{dt} = -1.46 \times 10^{28}~\text{[J/m]}~\times\frac{dR}{dt}~\text{[m/s]}.$$

With a shrinking of $-1\mathrm\frac{~mm}{yr} = -0.001\mathrm\frac{~m}{yr} = -3.17\times 10^{-11}~\mathrm\frac{m}{s}$, one gets

$$\frac{dU_r}{dt} = 4.63\times 10^{17}~\text{W},$$

dividing by the whole area of Jupiter, i.e. $S = 6.14\times 10^{16}~\mathrm{m^2}$, one gets

$$\frac{1}{S}\frac{dU_r}{dt} = 7.5~\mathrm\frac{W}{m^2}.$$

Of course, one usually calculates this equation in the other direction: the experimental figure of the specific flux of internal heat, 7.485 W/m^{2}, was given from the direct measures made on the spot by the Cassini probe during its flyby on 30 December 2000 and one gets the amount of the shrinking, ~1 mm/year, a minute figure below the boundaries of practical measurement.
