= Kelvin's minimum energy theorem =

In fluid mechanics, Kelvin's minimum energy theorem (named after William Thomson, 1st Baron Kelvin who published it in 1849) states that the steady irrotational motion of an incompressible fluid occupying a simply connected region has less kinetic energy than any other motion with the same normal component of velocity at the boundary (and, if the domain extends to infinity, with zero value values there).

== Mathematical Proof ==
Let $\mathbf{u}$ be the velocity field of an incompressible irrotational fluid and $\mathbf{u_1}$ be that of any other incompressible fluid motion with same normal component velocity $\mathbf{u}\cdot\mathbf{n}=\mathbf{u_1}\cdot\mathbf{n}$ at the boundary of the domain, where $\mathbf{n}$ is the unit vector of the bounding surface (and, if the domain extends to infinity, $\mathbf{u}\cdot\mathbf{n}=\mathbf{u_1}\cdot\mathbf{n}=0$ there). Then the difference between the kinetic energy is given by

$$T_1-T = \frac{1}{2} \rho \int(\mathbf{u}_1^2-\mathbf{u}^2)\ dV$$

can be rearranged to give

$$T_1-T = \frac{1}{2} \rho \int(\mathbf{u}_1-\mathbf{u})^2\ dV + \rho \int (\mathbf{u}_1-\mathbf{u})\cdot\mathbf{u}\ dV.$$

Since $\mathbf{u}$ is irrotational and the domain is simply-connected, a single-valued velocity potential exists, i.e., $\mathbf{u}=\nabla\phi$. Using this, the second integral in the above equation can be written as

$$\int (\mathbf{u}_1-\mathbf{u})\cdot\nabla\phi\ dV = \int \nabla\cdot[(\mathbf{u}_1-\mathbf{u})\phi]\ dV - \int\phi\nabla\cdot(\mathbf{u}_1-\mathbf{u})\ dV.$$

The second integral is identically zero for steady incompressible fluid, i.e., $\nabla\cdot\mathbf{u}=\nabla\cdot\mathbf{u}_1=0$. Applying the Gauss theorem for the first integral we find

$$\int (\mathbf{u}_1-\mathbf{u})\cdot\nabla\phi\ dV = \int \phi(\mathbf{u}_1-\mathbf{u})\cdot\mathbf{n}\ dA$$

where the surface integral is zero since normal component of velocities are equal there. Thus, one concludes

$$T_1-T=\frac{1}{2} \rho \int(\mathbf{u}_1-\mathbf{u})^2\ dV \geq 0$$

or in other words, $T_1\geq T$, where the equality holds only if $\mathbf{u}_1=\mathbf{u}$, thereby proving the theorem.
