= James Thomson (engineer) =

British engineer and physicist (1822–1892)

James Thomson FRS FRSE LLD
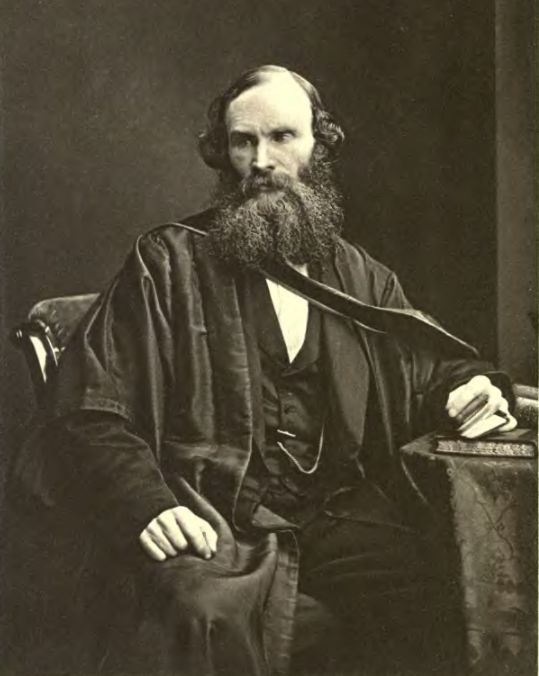
- Photograph of Thomson from the book Collected Papers in Physics and Engineering by James Thomson.
- Born: 16 February 1822; Belfast, Ireland
- Died: 8 May 1892 (aged 70); Glasgow, Scotland
- Resting place: Glasgow Necropolis
- Education: University of Glasgow
- Known for: Ball-and-disk integrator Differential analyser Tea leaf paradox Tears of wine
- Parent: James Thomson (father)
- Relatives: Lord Kelvin (brother)
- Awards: Bakerian Medal (1892); FRS (1877)

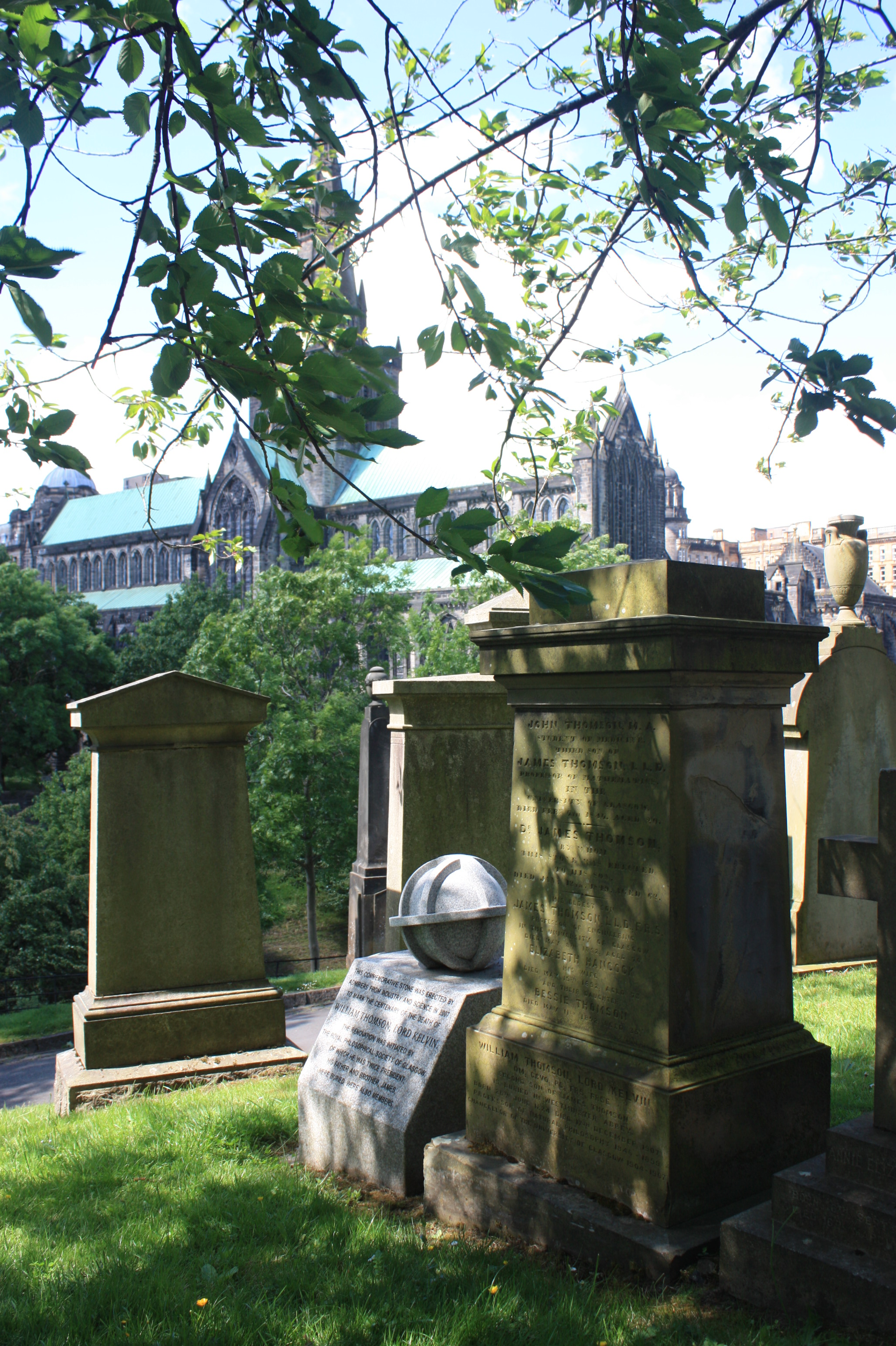
The grave of the Thomson family, Glasgow Necropolis

James Thomson (16 February 1822 – 8 May 1892) was a British engineer and physicist. He was the older brother of Lord Kelvin.

== Biography ==
James Thomson was born in Belfast on 16 February 1822. Much of his youth was spent in Glasgow. His father, James, was professor of mathematics at the University of Glasgow from 1832 onwards. His younger brother, William, later became Lord Kelvin as the first scientist elevated to the House of Lords, and the kelvin unit of temperature is named after him.

He attended the University of Glasgow from a young age and graduated in 1839 with high honours. He then served brief apprenticeships with practical engineers in several domains, and devoted a considerable amount of his time to theoretical and mathematical engineering studies, often in collaboration with his brother, during his twenties in Glasgow. In his late twenties he entered into private practice as a professional engineer with special expertise in water transport. In 1855 he was appointed professor of civil engineering at Queen's University Belfast. He remained there until 1873, when he accepted the Regius professorship of Civil Engineering and Mechanics at the University of Glasgow (in which post he was successor to the influential William Rankine) until he resigned with failing eyesight in 1889.

In 1875 he was elected a Fellow of the Royal Society of Edinburgh. His proposers were his younger brother William Thomson, Peter Guthrie Tait, Alexander Crum Brown and John Hutton Balfour. He was elected a Fellow of the Royal Society of London in June 1877.

He served as President of the Institution of Engineers and Shipbuilders in Scotland from 1884 to 1886.

In later life he lived at 2 Florentine Gardens, off Hillhead Street.

He died of cholera in Glasgow on 8 May 1892. He is buried on the northern slopes of the Glasgow Necropolis, overlooking Glasgow Cathedral. One obituary described Thomson as "a man of singular purity of mind and simplicity of character" whose "gentle kindness and unfailing courtesy will be long remembered."

== Legacy ==
Thomson worked on improvements of water wheels, water pumps and turbines. His work included the analysis of regelation, i.e., the effect of pressure on the freezing point of water, and studies in glaciology including glacier motion, where he extended the work of James David Forbes. He studied the experimental work of his colleague Thomas Andrews, concerning the continuity of the liquid and gaseous states of matter, and strengthened understanding of it by applying his knowledge of thermodynamics. He derived a simplified form of the Clapeyron equation for the solid-liquid phase boundary. He proposed the term triple point to describe the conditions for which solid, liquid and vapour states are all in equilibrium.

He also made contributions in the realm of fluid dynamics of rivers. It is claimed that the term torque was introduced into English scientific literature by Thomson, in 1884.

== Publications ==
Thomson's main published research reports in physics and engineering were republished as a 500-page collection after his death. The collection is prefaced by a biography.

== See also ==
- Marangoni effect
- Rayleigh–Bénard convection
