= Kelvin functions =

Plot of the Kelvin function ber(z) in the complex plane from -2-2i to 2+2i with colors created with Mathematica 13.1 function ComplexPlot3D

In applied mathematics, the Kelvin functions ber_{ν}(x) and bei_{ν}(x) are the real and imaginary parts, respectively, of

$J_\nu \left (x e^{\frac{3 \pi i}{4}} \right ),\,$

where x is real, and J_{ν}(z), is the ν^{th} order Bessel function of the first kind. Similarly, the functions ker_{ν}(x) and kei_{ν}(x) are the real and imaginary parts, respectively, of

$e^{-\nu\pi i/2}K_\nu \left (x e^{\frac{\pi i}{4}} \right ),\,$

where K_{ν}(z) is the ν^{th} order modified Bessel function of the second kind.

These functions are named after William Thomson, 1st Baron Kelvin.

While the Kelvin functions are defined as the real and imaginary parts of Bessel functions with x taken to be real, the functions can be analytically continued for complex arguments xe^{iφ}, 0 ≤ φ < 2π. With the exception of ber_{n}(x) and bei_{n}(x) for integral n, the Kelvin functions have a branch point at x = 0.

Below, Γ(z) is the gamma function and ψ(z) is the digamma function.

== ber(x) ==
ber(x) for x between 0 and 20.

$\mathrm{ber}(x) / e^{x/\sqrt{2}}$ for x between 0 and 50.

For integers n, ber_{n}(x) has the series expansion

$$\mathrm{ber}_n(x) = \left(\frac{x}{2}\right)^n \sum_{k \geq 0} \frac{\cos\left[\left(\frac{3n}{4} + \frac{k}{2}\right)\pi\right]}{k! \Gamma(n + k + 1)} \left(\frac{x^2}{4}\right)^k ,$$

where Γ(z) is the gamma function. The special case ber_{0}(x), commonly denoted as just ber(x), has the series expansion

$$\mathrm{ber}(x) = 1 + \sum_{k \geq 1} \frac{(-1)^k}{[(2k)!]^2} \left(\frac{x}{2} \right )^{4k}$$

and asymptotic series

$$\mathrm{ber}(x) \sim \frac{e^{\frac{x}{\sqrt{2}}}}{\sqrt{2 \pi x}} \left (f_1(x) \cos \alpha + g_1(x) \sin \alpha \right ) - \frac{\mathrm{kei}(x)}{\pi}$$,

where

$$\alpha = \frac{x}{\sqrt{2}} - \frac{\pi}{8},$$
$$f_1(x) = 1 + \sum_{k \geq 1} \frac{\cos(k \pi / 4)}{k! (8x)^k} \prod_{l = 1}^k (2l - 1)^2$$
$$g_1(x) = \sum_{k \geq 1} \frac{\sin(k \pi / 4)}{k! (8x)^k} \prod_{l = 1}^k (2l - 1)^2 .$$

Plot of the Kelvin function bei(z) in the complex plane from -2-2i to 2+2i with colors created with Mathematica 13.1 function ComplexPlot3D

== bei(x) ==
bei(x) for x between 0 and 20.

$\mathrm{bei}(x) / e^{x/\sqrt{2}}$ for x between 0 and 50.

For integers n, bei_{n}(x) has the series expansion

$$\mathrm{bei}_n(x) = \left(\frac{x}{2}\right)^n \sum_{k \geq 0} \frac{\sin\left[\left(\frac{3n}{4} + \frac{k}{2}\right)\pi\right]}{k! \Gamma(n + k + 1)} \left(\frac{x^2}{4}\right)^k .$$

The special case bei_{0}(x), commonly denoted as just bei(x), has the series expansion

Plot of the Kelvin function ker(z) in the complex plane from -2-2i to 2+2i with colors created with Mathematica 13.1 function ComplexPlot3D

$\mathrm{bei}(x) = \sum_{k \geq 0} \frac{(-1)^k }{[(2k+1)!]^2} \left(\frac{x}{2} \right )^{4k+2}$

and asymptotic series

$$\mathrm{bei}(x) \sim \frac{e^{\frac{x}{\sqrt{2}}}}{\sqrt{2 \pi x}} [f_1(x) \sin \alpha - g_1(x) \cos \alpha] - \frac{\mathrm{ker}(x)}{\pi},$$

where α, $f_1(x)$, and $g_1(x)$ are defined as for ber(x).

== ker(x) ==
ker(x) for x between 0 and 14.

$\mathrm{ker}(x) e^{x/\sqrt{2}}$ for x between 0 and 50.

For integers n, ker_{n}(x) has the (complicated) series expansion

$$\begin{align}
&\mathrm{ker}_n(x) = - \ln\left(\frac{x}{2}\right) \mathrm{ber}_n(x) + \frac{\pi}{4}\mathrm{bei}_n(x) \\
&+ \frac{1}{2} \left(\frac{x}{2}\right)^{-n} \sum_{k=0}^{n-1} \cos\left[\left(\frac{3n}{4} + \frac{k}{2}\right)\pi\right] \frac{(n-k-1)!}{k!} \left(\frac{x^2}{4}\right)^k \\
&+ \frac{1}{2} \left(\frac{x}{2}\right)^n \sum_{k \geq 0} \cos\left[\left(\frac{3n}{4} + \frac{k}{2}\right)\pi\right] \frac{\psi(k+1) + \psi(n + k + 1)}{k! (n+k)!} \left(\frac{x^2}{4}\right)^k .
\end{align}$$

Plot of the Kelvin function kei(z) in the complex plane from -2-2i to 2+2i with colors created with Mathematica 13.1 function ComplexPlot3D

The special case ker_{0}(x), commonly denoted as just ker(x), has the series expansion

$$\mathrm{ker}(x) = -\ln\left(\frac{x}{2}\right) \mathrm{ber}(x) + \frac{\pi}{4}\mathrm{bei}(x) + \sum_{k \geq 0} (-1)^k \frac{\psi(2k + 1)}{[(2k)!]^2} \left(\frac{x^2}{4}\right)^{2k}$$

and the asymptotic series

$$\mathrm{ker}(x) \sim \sqrt{\frac{\pi}{2x}} e^{-\frac{x}{\sqrt{2}}} [f_2(x) \cos \beta + g_2(x) \sin \beta],$$

where

$$\beta = \frac{x}{\sqrt{2}} + \frac{\pi}{8},$$
$$f_2(x) = 1 + \sum_{k \geq 1} (-1)^k \frac{\cos(k \pi / 4)}{k! (8x)^k} \prod_{l = 1}^k (2l - 1)^2$$
$$g_2(x) = \sum_{k \geq 1} (-1)^k \frac{\sin(k \pi / 4)}{k! (8x)^k} \prod_{l = 1}^k (2l - 1)^2.$$

== kei(x) ==
kei(x) for x between 0 and 14.

$\mathrm{kei}(x) e^{x/\sqrt{2}}$ for x between 0 and 50.

For integer n, kei_{n}(x) has the series expansion

$$\begin{align}
&\mathrm{kei}_n(x) = - \ln\left(\frac{x}{2}\right) \mathrm{bei}_n(x) - \frac{\pi}{4}\mathrm{ber}_n(x) \\
&-\frac{1}{2} \left(\frac{x}{2}\right)^{-n} \sum_{k=0}^{n-1} \sin\left[\left(\frac{3n}{4} + \frac{k}{2}\right)\pi\right] \frac{(n-k-1)!}{k!} \left(\frac{x^2}{4}\right)^k  \\
&+ \frac{1}{2} \left(\frac{x}{2}\right)^n \sum_{k \geq 0} \sin\left[\left(\frac{3n}{4} + \frac{k}{2}\right)\pi\right] \frac{\psi(k+1) + \psi(n + k + 1)}{k! (n+k)!} \left(\frac{x^2}{4}\right)^k .
\end{align}$$

The special case kei_{0}(x), commonly denoted as just kei(x), has the series expansion

$$\mathrm{kei}(x) = -\ln\left(\frac{x}{2}\right) \mathrm{bei}(x) - \frac{\pi}{4}\mathrm{ber}(x) + \sum_{k \geq 0} (-1)^k \frac{\psi(2k + 2)}{[(2k+1)!]^2} \left(\frac{x^2}{4}\right)^{2k+1}$$

and the asymptotic series

$$\mathrm{kei}(x) \sim -\sqrt{\frac{\pi}{2x}} e^{-\frac{x}{\sqrt{2}}} [f_2(x) \sin \beta + g_2(x) \cos \beta],$$

where β, f_{2}(x), and g_{2}(x) are defined as for ker(x).

== See also ==
- Bessel function
