= Automatic curb sender =

Telegraph key

The automatic curb sender was a kind of telegraph key, invented by William Thomson, 1st Baron Kelvin for sending messages on a submarine communications cable, as the well-known Wheatstone transmitter sends them on a land line.

In both instruments, the signals are sent by means of a perforated ribbon of paper but the cable sender was the more complicated, because the cable signals are formed by both positive and negative currents, and not merely by a single current, whether positive or negative. Moreover, to curb the prolongation of the signals due to electromagnetic induction, each signal was made by two opposite currents in succession: a positive followed by a negative, or a negative followed by a positive. The aftercurrent had the effect of "curbing" its precursor.

For some time, it was the only instrument delicate enough to receive the signals transmitted through a long cable.

This self-acting cable key was brought out in 1876, and tried on the lines of the Eastern Telegraph Company.
