= James Thomson (mathematician) =

Irish mathematician (1786 – 1849)

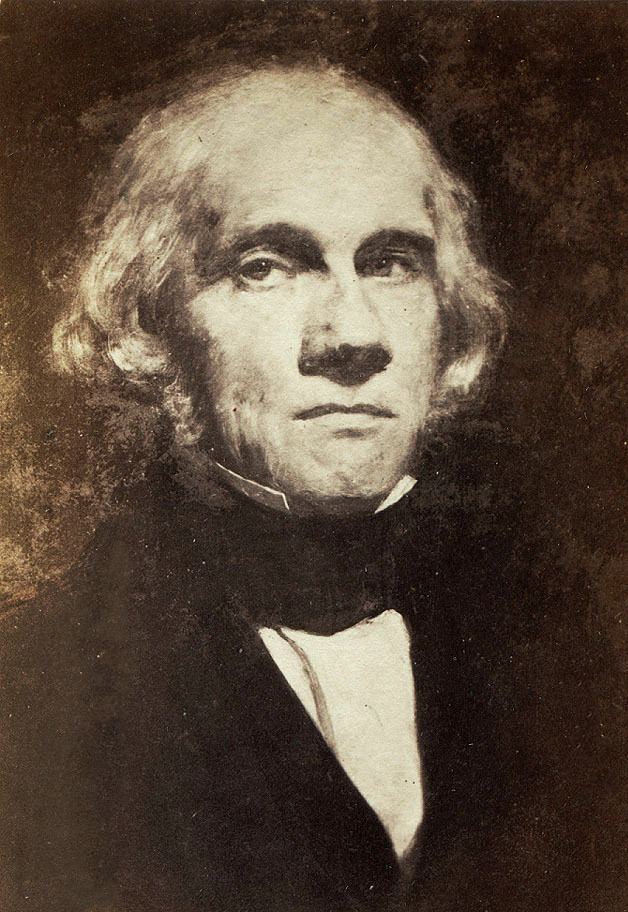
- Born: 13 November 1786; Ballynahinch, County Down, Ulster, Kingdom of Ireland
- Died: 12 January 1849 (aged 62)
- Spouse: Margaret Gardiner (m. 1817; died 1830)
- Children: 7, including: James Thomson; The 1st Baron Kelvin

Academic background
- Education: University of Glasgow

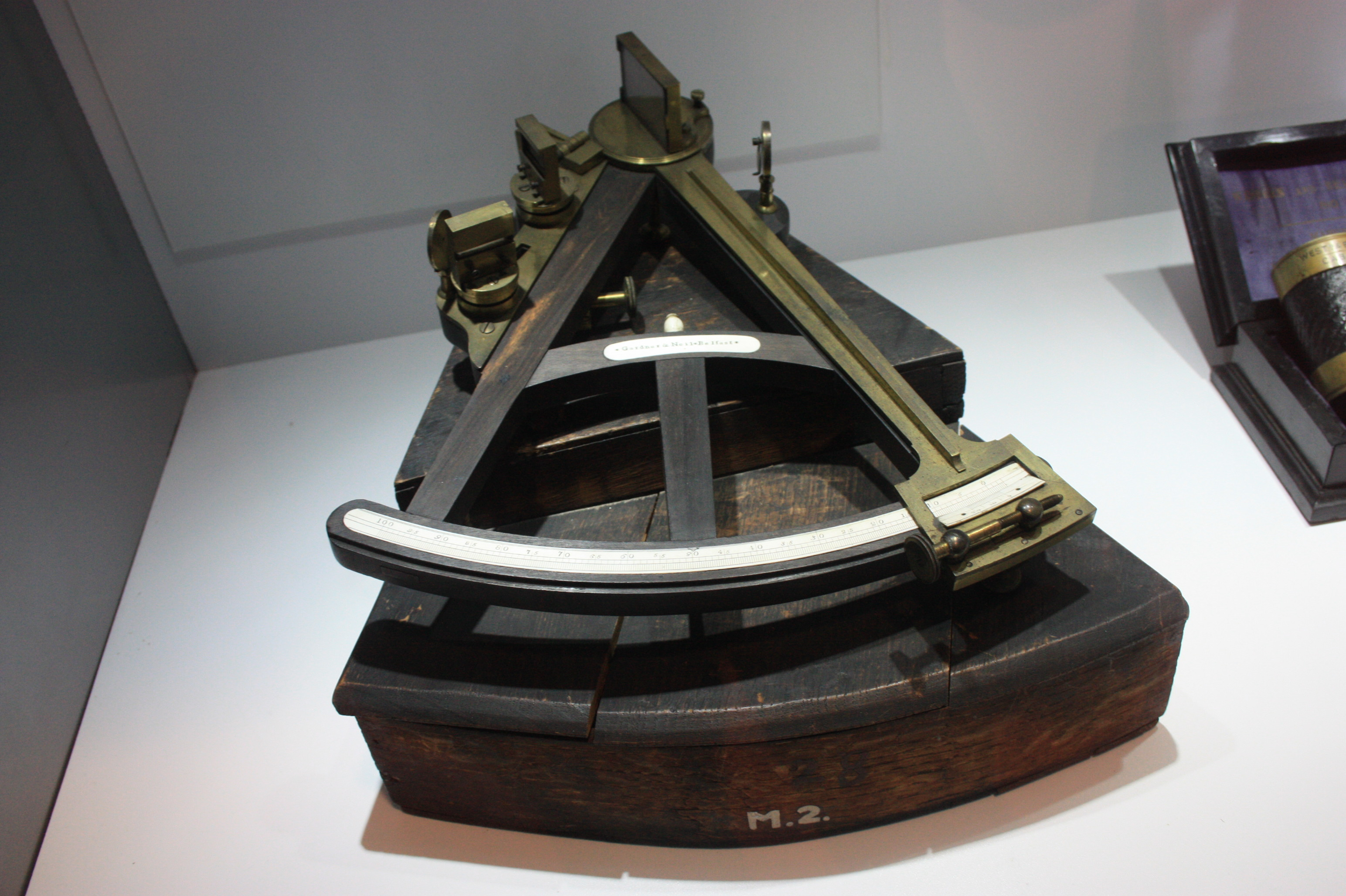
James Thomson's octant, Hunterian Museum, Glasgow

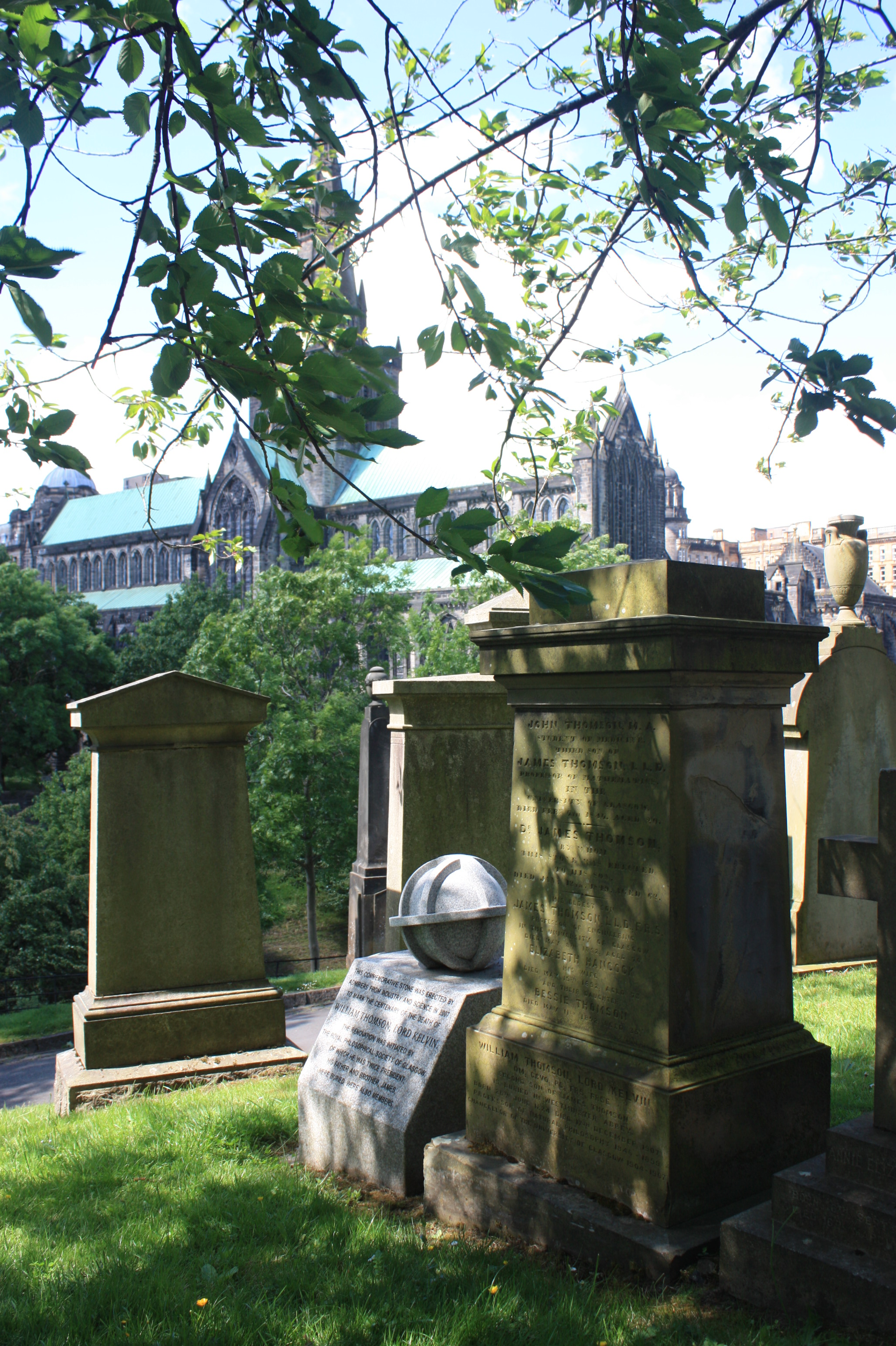
The grave of the Thomson family, Glasgow Necropolis

James Thomson (13 November 1786 – 12 January 1849) was a British Irish mathematician. He was the father of the engineer and physicist James Thomson and the physicist Lord Kelvin.

== Life ==
Born into an Ulster-Scots family on 13 November 1786, Thomson was the fourth son of Agnes Nesbit and James Thomson, a small farmer, at Annaghmore, near Ballynahinch, County Down (the house was later called Spamount), in Ulster. His early education was from his father. At age 11 or 12 he had found out for himself the art of dialling. His father sent him to a school at Ballykine, near Ballynahinch, kept by Samuel Edgar, father of John Edgar. Thomson soon rose to be an assistant.

Wishing to become a minister of the Presbyterian Church, in 1810 he entered the University of Glasgow, where he studied for several sessions, supporting himself by teaching in the Ballykine school during the summer. He graduated with an MA in 1812, and in 1814 he was appointed teacher of mathematics and arithmetic in the newly established Academical Institution, Belfast; and in 1815 he was also appointed as professor of mathematics in its collegiate department. He was an able teacher and was an author of a number of very popular textbooks. In 1829 the honorary degree of LLD was conferred upon him by the University of Glasgow, where in 1832 he was appointed sixth professor of mathematics. He held this post till his death on 12 January 1849.

He is buried on the northern slopes of the Glasgow Necropolis to the east of the main bridge entrance. The grave is notable because the modern memorial to Lord Kelvin is at its side.

== Family ==
In 1817 Thomson married Margaret Gardiner (d.1830), eldest daughter of William Gardiner of Glasgow. They had four sons and three daughters, including James (1822–1892) and William, afterwards Lord Kelvin (1824–1907), the two elder sons. He was portrayed by John Graham-Gilbert.

== Works ==
He was the author of the schoolbooks that passed through many editions:

- ‘Arithmetic,’ Belfast, 1819; 72nd ed. London, 1880.
- ‘Trigonometry, Plane and Spherical,’ Belfast, 1820; 4th ed. London, 1844.
- ‘Introduction to Modern Geography,’ Belfast, 1827.
- ‘The Phenomena of the Heavens,’ Belfast, 1827.
- ‘The Differential and Integral Calculus,’ 1831; 2nd ed. London, 1848.
- ‘Euclid,’ 1834.
- ‘Atlas of Modern Geography.’
- ‘Algebra,’ 1844.

A paper ‘Recollections of the Battle of Ballynahinch, by an Eye-witness,’ which appeared in the Belfast Magazine for February 1825, was from his pen.
