= Kelvin transform =

Extension of the concept of a harmonic function

The Kelvin transform is a device used in classical potential theory to extend the concept of a harmonic function, by allowing the definition of a function which is 'harmonic at infinity'. This technique is also used in the study of subharmonic and superharmonic functions.

In order to define the Kelvin transform f^{*} of a function f, it is necessary to first consider the concept of inversion in a sphere in R^{n} as follows.

It is possible to use inversion in any sphere, but the ideas are clearest when considering a sphere with centre at the origin.

Given a fixed sphere S(0, R) with centre 0 and radius R, the inversion of a point x in R^{n} is defined to be
$$x^* = \frac{R^2}{|x|^2} x.$$

A useful effect of this inversion is that the origin 0 is the image of $\infty$, and $\infty$ is the image of 0. Under this inversion, spheres are transformed into spheres, and the exterior of a sphere is transformed to the interior, and vice versa.

The Kelvin transform of a function is then defined by:

If D is an open subset of R^{n} which does not contain 0, then for any function f defined on D, the Kelvin transform f^{*} of f with respect to the sphere S(0, R) is
$$f^*(x^*) = \frac{|x|^{n-2}}{R^{2n-4}}f(x) = \frac{1}{|x^*|^{n-2}}f(x) = \frac{1}{|x^*|^{n-2}} f\left(\frac{R^2}{|x^*|^2} x^*\right).$$

One of the important properties of the Kelvin transform, and the main reason behind its creation, is the following result:

Let D be an open subset in R^{n} which does not contain the origin 0. Then a function u is harmonic, subharmonic or superharmonic in D if and only if the Kelvin transform u^{*} with respect to the sphere S(0, R) is harmonic, subharmonic or superharmonic in D^{*}.

This follows from the formula
$$\Delta u^*(x^*) = \frac{R^{4}}{|x^*|^{n+2}}(\Delta u)\left(\frac{R^2}{|x^*|^2} x^*\right).$$

== See also ==
- William Thomson, 1st Baron Kelvin
- Inversive geometry
- Spherical wave transformation
