= Voigt–Thomson law =

Voigt–Thomson law describes anisotropic magnetoresistance effect in a thin film strip as a relationship between the electric resistivity and the direction of electric current:

$$\rho (\vartheta) = \rho_0 + \Delta \rho \cdot cos^2 \vartheta$$

where:

$\vartheta \$ is the angle of direction of current in relation to the direction of magnetic field
$\rho_0 \$ is the initial resistivity
$\Delta \rho \$ is the change of resistivity (proportional to MR ratio)

The equation can also be expressed as:

$$\rho (\vartheta) = \rho_\parallel \cdot  cos^2 \vartheta + \rho_\perp \cdot sin^2 \vartheta$$

where:

$\rho_\parallel \$ is the parallel component of resistivity
$\rho_\perp\$ is the perpendicular component
