= Kevin =

- Pronunciation: /ˈkɛvɪn/
- Gender: Masculine
- Language: English

Origin
- Language: Irish
- Origin: Caoimhín
- Meaning: 'of noble birth'

Other names
- Variant forms: Caoimheán, Kevan, Kevyn

Kevin is the anglicized form of the Irish masculine given name Caoimhín (Irish pronunciation: [ˈkiːvʲiːnʲ]; Middle Irish: Caoimhghín [ˈkəiṽʲʝiːnʲ]; Old Irish: Cóemgein [ˈkoiṽʲɣʲinʲ]; Latinized as Coemgenus). It is composed of caomh "dear; noble"; Old Irish cóem and -gin ("birth"; Old Irish gein).

The variant Kevan is anglicised from Caoimheán, an Irish diminutive form. The feminine version of the name is Caoimhe (anglicised as Keeva or Kweeva).

The variant Kévin became popular in France in the 1990s.

== History ==
Saint Kevin (died 618) founded Glendalough abbey in the Kingdom of Leinster in 6th-century Ireland. Canonized in 1903, he is one of the patron saints of the Archdiocese of Dublin. Caomhán of Inisheer, the patron saint of Inisheer, Aran Islands, is properly anglicized Cavan or Kevan, but often also referred to as "Kevin".

The name was rarely given before the 20th century. In Ireland an early bearer of the anglicised name was Kevin Izod O'Doherty (1823–1905) a Young Irelander and politician; it gained popularity from the Gaelic revival of the late nineteenth century, with Kevin Barry and Kevin O'Higgins prominent in the Irish revolutionary period. Later it was "widely adopted throughout the English-speaking world", surging in popularity during the 1950s. In the United States the name's popularity peaked at rank 11 in 1963. It has steadily decreased in popularity since then, but was still given with moderate frequency in the 2010s, at rank 89 as of 2016. Kevin fell out of the US Top 100 the following year and now ranks at Number 156. The name followed a similar trajectory in the United Kingdom, gaining popularity in the 1950s, peaking in the 1960s, gradually declining in the 1970s to 1980s, and falling out of the top 100 most popularly given names by the 1990s.

Oxford's A Dictionary of First Names suggests that anglicized Kevin may have influenced the adoption of Kelvin (in origin a river name) as a modern given name, which peaked in popularity at about the same time, albeit to a much lesser extent (peaking at rank 209 as of 1961 in the US).

In continental Europe, the name picked up popularity in the 1980s and 1990s via such American pop culture figures as actor Kevin Costner, singer Kevin Richardson, and, most prominently, Kevin McCallister, Macaulay Culkin's character in the Christmas comedy film Home Alone. The name "Kevin" was notorious for being extremely popular among lower-class parents in Europe between the end of the 1980s and the 2000s. The name peaked markedly in the early 1990s, reaching first rank in France (sometimes spelt Kévin) during 1989–1994, during 1991–1992 in Switzerland and in 1991 in Germany. In German markets, Home Alone was released as Kevin – Allein zu Haus. Especially in Germany, the name became associated with low social status, an attitude popularised in German journalism based on a 2009 master thesis on primary teachers' reactions to children's given names. Kevinismus has become German short-hand for negative social preconceptions about trendy or exotic names. The name has had similar negative connotations in France.

== People ==
- Kevin (footballer, born 1997), full name Kevin Peterson dos Santos Silva, Brazilian footballer
- Kevin (footballer, born 2003), full name Kevin Santos Lopes de Macedo, Brazilian footballer
- Kevin Abernathy (born 1991), American editor and occasional host of shows on the Game Grumps platform
- Kevin Abley (1935–2024), Australian rules footballer
- Kevin Agudelo (born 1998), Colombian footballer
- Kevin Akpoguma (born 1995), German-Nigerian footballer
- Kevin Alaníz (born 2003), Uruguayan footballer
- Kevin Almeroth, professor of computer science
- Kevin Álvarez (born 1996), Honduran footballer
- Kevin Álvarez (born 1999), Mexican footballer
- Kevin Amuneke (born 1986), Nigerian footballer
- Kevin Anderson (born 1960), American actor
- Kevin Anderson (born 1986), South African tennis player
- Kevin J. Anderson (born 1962), American science fiction author
- Kevin Appier (born 1967), American baseball pitcher
- Kevin Archer (born 1958), English musician and member of Dexy's Midnight Runners
- Kevin Ashman (born 1959), English quiz player
- Jean-Kévin Augustin (born 1997), French footballer
- Kevin Austin Jr. (born 2000), American football player
- Kevin Ayers (1944–2013), English songwriter
- Kevin Bacon, multiple people
- Kevin Balot (born 1991), Filipino beauty pageant queen
- Kevin Barker (born 1975), baseball player
- Kevin Balanta (born 1997), Colombian footballer
- Kevin Bazzell (born 2003), American baseball player
- Kevin Beattie (1953–2018), English footballer
- Kevin Begois (born 1982), Belgian footballer
- Kevin Betsy (born 1978), English-Seychellois footballer
- Kevin Behrens (born 1991), German footballer
- Kevin Bellie (born 1971), American director and choreographer
- Kevin Benavides (born 1989), Argentine rally raid motorcyclist
- Kevin Bieksa (born 1981), Canadian former professional ice hockey player
- Kevin Bigley (born 1986), American television and film actor
- Kevin Bishop (born 1980), British actor, comedian and writer
- Kevin-Prince Boateng (born 1987), German-born Ghanaian footballer
- Kevin Bobson (born 1980), Dutch footballer
- Kevin Bonifazi (born 1996), Italian footballer
- Kevin Bouie (born 1971), American football player
- Kevin Boyles (born 1967), Canadian volleyball player
- Kevin Brands (born 1988), Dutch footballer
- Kevin Bridges (born 1986), Scottish comedian
- Kevin Brockman, American businessman
- Kevin Broll (born 1995), German footballer
- Kevin Bua (born 1993), Swiss footballer
- Kevin Bukusu (born 2001), German footballer
- Kevin Burke (born 1993), American football player
- Kevin Burleson (born 1979), American basketball coach and former player
- Kevin Campbell, multiple people
- Kevin Cannavò (born 2000), Italian footballer
- Kevin Carlberg (born 1987), American musician
- Kev Carmody (born 1946), Australian singer-songwriter
- Kevin Carr (born 1958), English football goalkeeper
- Kevin Carroll (born 1969), American football player
- Kevin Carter (1960–1994), South African photographer
- Kevin Cash (born 1977), American baseball manager
- Dimitri Kévin Cavaré (born 1995), Guadeloupean-French footballer
- Kevin Ceceri (born 1996), Argentine footballer
- Kevin Chambliss (born 1981), American politician
- Kevin Cheng (born 1969), American-born Hong Kong actor
- Kevin Clash (born 1960), American puppeteer, director and producer
- Kevin Cogan (born 1956), American racing driver
- Kevin Coleman (born 1998), American soccer player
- Kevin Conboy (born 1987), Danish footballer
- Kevin Concepcion (born 2004), American football player
- Kevin Conrad (born 1968), Papua New Guinean businessman and environmentalist
- Kevin Conrad (footballer) (born 1990), German footballer
- Kevin Conroy (1955–2022), American actor
- Kevin Coombs (1941–2023), Australian wheelchair basketballer and athlete
- Kevin Coogan (1952–2020), American journalist and author
- Kevin Corrigan (born 1969), American actor
- Kevin Costner (born 1955), American actor
- Kevin Crump (died 2023), Australian murderer
- Kevin Csoboth (born 2000), Hungarian footballer
- Kevin Dailey, American musician
- Kevin N. Dalby, American pharmacist
- Kevin Daley (politician) (born 1957), American politician
- Kevin Daley (basketball) (born 1976), Panamanian basketball player
- Kevin Danaher (Caoimhín Ó Danachair, 1913–2002), Irish folklorist
- Kevin Danso (born 1998), Austrian footballer
- Kevin Davidson (born 1997), American football player
- Kevin Dawson (born 1992), Uruguayan footballer
- Kevin De Bruyne (born 1991), Belgian footballer
- Kevin Deeromram (born 1997), Swedish born Thai footballer
- Kevin DeShields Jr. (born 2000), American footballer
- Kevin Desouza (born 1979), Indian American academic
- Kevin Diaz, multiple people
- Kevin Diks (born 1996), Dutch footballer
- Kevin Doherty or Kevin O'Doherty, multiple people
- Kevin Doyle, multiple people
- Kevin Duarte (born 2001), Argentine footballer
- Kevin Durand (born 1974), Canadian actor
- Kevin Durant (born 1988), American basketball player
- Jean-Kévin Duverne (born 1997), French footballer
- Kevin Easley (born 1960), American oil and gas executive
- Kevin Eastman (born 1962), American comic book artist
- Kevin Ehlers (born 2001), German footballer
- Kevin Eldon (born 1959), English actor
- Kevin Escamilla (born 1994), Mexican footballer
- Kevin Farell (born 1996), Bolivian footballer
- Kevin Farrell (born 1947), Irish-born American Catholic cardinal
- Kevin Faulconer (born 1967), American politician and former mayor of San Diego
- Kevin Faulk (born 1976), American football player
- Kevin Federline (born 1978), American dancer
- Kevin Felida (born 1999), Dutch footballer
- Kevin Fend (born 1990), Austrian footballer
- Kevin Fertig (born 1977), American professional wrestler
- Kevin Fickentscher (born 1988), Swiss footballer
- Kevin Foelsch (born 2001), American football player
- Kevin Foley (born 1984), English-Irish footballer
- Kevin Forster (born 1958), English long-distance runner
- Kevin Foster (born Kevin Bates; 1977), American murderer and leader of the "Lords of Chaos"
- Kevin Frandsen (born 1982), American professional Baseball player
- Kevin Freiberger (born 1988), German footballer
- Kevin Fret (1993–2019), Puerto Rican rapper
- Kevin Friedland (born 1981), American soccer player
- Kevin Friesenbichler (born 1994), Austrian footballer
- Kevin Gallacher (born 1966), Scottish footballer
- Kevin Galloway (born 1991), American-Iraqi basketball player
- Kevin Gameiro (born 1987), French footballer
- Kevin Garnett (born 1976), American basketball player
- Kevin Gausman (born 1991), American baseball player
- Kevin Ginkel (born 1994), American baseball player
- Kevin Gissi (born 1992), Swiss-Argentine footballer
- Kevin Givens (born 1997), American football player
- Kevin Goden (born 1999), German footballer
- Kevin Gomez-Nieto (born 1994), Dutch footballer
- Kevin Gordon (rugby league) (born 1989), Australian Rugby player
- Kevin Green or Kevin Greene, multiple people
- Kevin Greening (1962–2007), British radio broadcaster
- Kevin Gregg (born 1978), American baseball player
- Kevin Großkreutz (born 1988), German footballer
- Kevin Grund (born 1987), German footballer
- Kevin Hansen, multiple people
- Kevin Harbottle (born 1990), Chilean footballer
- Kevin Harlan (born 1960), American television and radio sports announcer
- Kevin Harris, multiple people
- Kevin Harrison (born 1981), American former football linebacker
- Kevin Hart (born 1979), American actor and comedian
- Kevin Harvick (born 1975), American race car driver
- Kevin Haskins (born 1960), British drummer
- Kevin Haverdink (born 1965), American football player
- Kevin Hayes or Kevin Hays, multiple people
- Kevin Hector (born 1944), English footballer
- Kevin Heinze (1928–2008), Australian television presenter
- Kevin Herget (born 1991), American baseball player
- Kevin Hicks (disappeared 1986), English missing schoolboy
- Kevin Hingerl (born 1993), German footballer
- Kevin Hoffmann (born 1995), German footballer
- Kevin Hofland (born 1979), Dutch footballer and manager
- Kevin Holzweiler (born 1994), German footballer
- Kevin Ingreso (born 1993), German-Filipino footballer
- Kevin Isa Luna (born 2001), Argentine footballer
- Kevin Itabel (born 1993), Argentine footballer
- Kevin James (disambiguation), multiple people
- Kevin Jansen (born 1992), Dutch footballer
- Kevin Janssens, multiple people
- Kevin Jobity Jr. (born 2003), American football player
- Kevin Johansen (born 1964), Argentine musician
- Kevin Johnson, multiple people
- Kevin Jonas (born 1987), member of the Jonas Brothers
- Kevin Kabran (born 1993), Swedish footballer
- Kevin Kállai (born 2002), Hungarian footballer
- Kevin Kampl (born 1990), Slovenian footballer
- Kevin Kauber (born 1995), Estonian footballer
- Kevin Keatts (born 1972), American basketball coach
- Kevin Keegan (1951–2026), English footballer and coach
- Kevin Keelan (born 1941), English footballer
- Kevin Keen (born 1967), English footballer and coach
- Kevin Kerr, multiple people
- Kevin Kiermaier (born 1990), American baseball player
- Kevin Kilbane (born 1977), English-Irish footballer
- Kevin Kilner (born 1958), American actor
- Kevin King, multiple people
- Kevin Kingston (born 1983), Australian Rugby League player
- Kevin Kline (born 1947), American actor
- Kevin Knowles (born 2003), American football player
- Kevin Koffi (born 1986), Ivorian footballer
- Kevin Kolevar, American businessman
- Kevin Korjus (born 1993), Estonian racing driver
- Kevin Kratz (born 1987), German footballer
- Kevin Kraus (born 1992), German footballer
- Kevin Martin Krygård (born 2000), Norwegian footballer
- Kevin Kühnert (born 1989), German politician
- Kevin Kunz (born 1992), German footballer
- Kevin Kurányi (born 1982), Brazil-born German footballer
- Kevin Kuske (born 1979), German bobsledder
- Kevin Kyle (born 1981), Scottish footballer
- Kevin James LaBrie (born 1963), Canadian singer
- Kevin Lacroix, multiple people
- Kevin Lafrance (born 1990), French-Haitian footballer
- Kevin Lankford (born 1998), German-American footballer
- Kevin Lasagna (born 1992), Italian footballer
- Kevin Le Gendre (living), British journalist, broadcaster
- Kevin Levrone (born 1964), American bodybuilder and actor
- Kevin LeVar, American musician
- Kevin Lilliana (born 1996), Indonesian beauty pageant contestant
- Kevin Lilly (born 1963), American football player
- Kevin Lisbie (born 1978), English-Jamaican footballer
- Kevin Lisch (born 1986), American basketball player
- Kevin Long, multiple people
- Kevin Love (born 1988), American basketball player
- Kevin Luckassen (born 1993), Dutch footballer
- Kevin Lukeeram, Mauritian politician
- Kevin Lundberg (born 1952), member of Colorado State Senate
- Kevin Lynch, multiple people
- Kevin Lomónaco (born 2002), Argentine footballer
- Kevin López, multiple people
- Kevin Mac Allister (born 1997), Argentine footballer
- Kevin MacLeod (born 1972), American music composer
- Kevin "King" Mack (born 2004), American football player
- Kevin Macmichael (1951–2002), Musician, co-founder of pop-rock group Cutting Crew
- Kevin Maek (born 1988), German footballer
- Kevin Magee, multiple people
- Kevin Maggs (born 1974), Irish rugby player
- Kevin Magnussen (born 1992), Danish racing driver
- Kevin Malget (born 1991), Luxembourgian footballer
- Kevin Mathurin (born 1973), English actor
- Kevin Matthews, multiple people
- Kevin Martin (born 1983), American basketball player
- Kevin Mason (born 1972), American football player
- Kevin Mayer (born 1992), French decathlete
- Kevin Mbabu (born 1995), Swiss footballer
- Kevin McCarthy, multiple people
- Kevin McCauley (born 1979), English professional boxer
- Kevin McDonald or Kevin MacDonald, multiple people
- Kevin McGonigle (born 2004), American baseball player
- Kevin McHale, multiple people
- Kevin McKenna (born 1980), Canadian soccer player
- Kevin McKidd (born 1973), Scottish film actor
- Kevin McMahon, multiple people
- Kevin McReynolds (born 1959), American former baseball player
- Kevin Mensah (footballer) (born 1991), Danish footballer
- Kevin Mercado (born 1995), Ecuadorian footballer
- Kevin Mirallas (born 1987), Belgian footballer
- Kevin Miles (born 1929), Australian actor
- Kevin Miles (born 1990), American actor
- Kevin Mitchell, multiple people
- Kevin Mitnick (1963-2023), computer security consultant and convicted hacker
- Kevin J. Miyazaki, graphic designer, photographer, and educator
- Hulisani Kevin Mmbara (born 1979), South African political youth leader
- Kevin Möhwald (born 1993), German footballer
- Kevin Molino (born 1990), Trinidadian footballer
- Kevin Moon (born 1987), French footballer
- Kevin Moon (born 1998), Canadian singer and artist
- Kevin Moran, multiple people
- Kevin Müller, multiple people
- Kevin Muscat (born 1973), Australian football manager
- Kevin Nadal (born 1978), author, professor, activist, and comedian
- Kevin Naiqama (born 1989), Australian-Fijian Rugby League player
- Kevin Nanney (born 1989), American professional Super Smash Bros. Melee player known as PPMD
- Kevin Nash (born 1959), American professional wrestler
- Kevin Nealon (born 1953), American actor
- Kevin Neufeld (born 1960), Canadian rower
- Kevin Newman, multiple people
- Kevin Newsome (born 1991), American football player
- Kevin Nisbet (born 1997), Scottish footballer
- Georges-Kévin Nkoudou (born 1995), French footballer
- Kevin Northcutt (born 1973), American retired professional wrestler
- Kevin Nugent, multiple people
- Caoimhghín Ó Caoláin (born 1953), Irish politician
- Kevin O'Higgins (Caoimhghín Ó hUigín, 1892–1927), Irish politician
- Kevin O'Leary, multiple people
- Caoimhín Ó Raghallaigh (born 1979), Irish fiddler
- Kevin Ollie (born 1972), American basketball player
- Kevin Onstott, American politician
- Kevin Oris (born 1984), Belgian footballer
- Kevin Ortiz (born 2000), Argentine footballer
- Kevin Owens (born 1984), Canadian professional wrestler
- Kevin Padlo (born 1996), American baseball player
- Kevin Pannewitz (born 1991), German footballer
- Kevin Paredes (born 2003), American soccer player
- Kevin Parker, multiple people
- Kevin Peterson (born 1994), American football player
- Kevin Pezzoni (born 1989), German footballer
- Kevin Pham Ba (born 1994), France footballer
- Kevin Phillips, multiple people
- Kevin Pietersen (born 1980), English cricketer
- Kevin Pillar (born 1989), major league baseball player
- Kevin Plank (born 1972), American billionaire businessman and philanthropist
- Kevin Plawecki (born 1991), American baseball player
- Kevin Pollak (born 1957), American actor
- Kevin Poon, Hong Kong-based entrepreneur, fashion designer, event organizer, and blogger
- Kevin Porter Jr. (born 2000), American basketball player
- Kevin Poulsen (born 1965), American former black-hat hacker
- Kevin Quevedo (born 1997), Peruvian footballer
- Kevin F. F. Quigley, American administrator
- Kevin B. Quinn (born 1979 or 1980), American chief executive officer
- Kevin Rader, multiple people
- Kevin Ramírez, multiple people
- Kevin Randleman (1971–2016), American mixed martial artist, amateur and professional wrestler
- Kevin Rankin, multiple people
- Kevin Rauhut (born 1989), German footballer
- Kevin Reynolds, multiple people
- Kevin Richards (racing driver) (born 1962), American racing driver
- Kevin Richardson, multiple people
- Kevin Ricks (born 1960), English former schoolteacher and convicted child molester and child pornography offender
- Kevin Robertson (born 1959), Water polo player
- Kevin Rodgers, musician in Golden Shower (band)
- Kevin Rodgers, candidate in Doncaster Council election, 2010
- Kevin Rodrigues-Pires (born 1991), German-Portuguese footballer
- Kevin Rogers (disambiguation), several people
- Kevin Rolland (born 1989), French freestyle skier
- Kevin D. Rome (born c. 1966), American university administrator
- Kevin Rose (born 1977), founder of Digg
- Kevin Rowland (born 1953), musician and former frontman of the band Dexys Midnight Runners
- Kevin Ruane (1932–2018), English journalist
- Kevin Rudd (born 1957), 26th Prime Minister of Australia, Minister of Foreign Affairs
- Kevin Rudolf (born 1983), American singer
- Kevin Rüegg (born 1998), Swiss footballer
- Kevin Sandoval, multiple people
- Kevin Sangsamanan (born 1997), Thai footballer
- Kevin Scheidhauer (born 1992), German footballer
- Kevin Schindler (born 1988), German footballer
- Kevin Schlitte (born 1981), German footballer
- Kevin Schöneberg (born 1985), German footballer
- Kevin Schulze (born 1992), German footballer
- Kevin Schwantz (born 1964), American road racer
- Kevin Seefried (born 1969 or 1970), American drywall mechanic and convicted felon
- Kevin Seitzer (born 1962), American baseball player and coach
- Kevin Sessa (born 2000), German footballer
- Kevin Sheedy, multiple people
- Kevin Sherman (born 1968), American football player and coach
- Kevin Shields (born 1963), musician
- Kevin Shoemake (born 1965), English footballer
- Kevin Sibille (born 1998), Argentine footballer
- Kevin Simm (born 1980), English singer, songwriter, and musician who was a member of the pop group Liberty X
- Kevin Simmons, Bahamian politician
- Kevin Sinfield (born 1980), English rugby league player and current captain of the Leeds Rhinos
- Kevin Sitorus (born 1994), Indonesian basketball player
- Kevin Smith or Kevin Smyth, multiple people
- Kevin Sorbo (born 1958), American actor
- Kevin Souter (born 1984), Scottish footballer
- Kevin Spacey (born 1959), American actor
- Kevin Sperry (born 2006), American football player
- Kevin St. James, American politician
- Kevin St. Onge, world record holder
- Kevin Steuke (born 1992), German footballer
- Kevin Stevens (born 1965), American hockey player
- Kevin Stewart, multiple people
- Kevin Stöger (born 1993), Austrian footballer
- Kevin Strickland (born 1959), American wrongfully convicted of murder
- Kevin Strong (born 1996), American football player
- Kevin Strootman (born 1990), Dutch footballer
- Kevin Stuhr Ellegaard (born 1983), Danish footballer
- Kevin Sullivan, multiple people
- Kevin Temmer (born 1993), American YouTuber, animator, and musician
- Kevin Terris (1944–2008), American racing driver
- Kevin Thorn (born 1977), American professional wrestler
- Kevin Tighe (born 1944), American actor
- Kevin Tittel (born 1994), German footballer
- Kevin Toliver II (born 1995), American football player
- Kevin Toner (born 1996), Irish footballer
- Kevin Trapp (born 1990), German footballer
- Kevin Tumba (born 1991), Belgian-Congolese basketball player
- Kevin Ray Underwood (born 1979), convicted murderer
- Kevin Ullyett (born 1972), former professional tennis player from Zimbabwe
- Kevin van Dessel (born 1979), Belgian footballer
- Kevin van Diermen (born 1989), Dutch footballer
- Kevin van Kippersluis (born 1993), Dutch footballer
- Kevin van Veen (born 1991), Dutch footballer
- Kevin Vandenbergh (born 1983), Belgian footballer
- Kevin Varga (born 1996), Hungarian footballer
- Kevin Vázquez Comesaña (born 1993), Spanish footballer
- Kevin Vermeulen (born 1990), Dutch footballer
- Kevin Verville, American politician from New Hampshire
- Kevin Vicuna (born 1998), Venezuelan professional baseball player
- Kevin Vink (born 1984), Dutch footballer
- Kevin Visser (born 1988), Dutch footballer
- Kevin Vogt (born 1991), German footballer
- Kevin Volland (born 1992), German footballer
- Kevin Von Erich (born 1957), retired American professional wrestler
- Kevin Walker, multiple people
- Kevin Ware (born 1993), American professional basketball player
- Kevin Ware (American football) (born 1980), American former professional football player
- Kevin Warwick (born 1954), British cybernetics professor at the University of Reading
- Kevin Waterhouse, American politician
- Kevin Weidlich (born 1989), German footballer
- Kevin Werdelmann, German songwriter and musician
- Kevin White, multiple people
- Kevin Widmer (born 1970), Swiss athlete
- Kevin Wilson (disambiguation), multiple people
- Kevin Wimmer (born 1992), Austrian footballer
- Kevin Winston Jr., American college football player
- Kevin C. Winter, American politician
- Kevin Wölk (born 1985), German footballer
- Kevin Wolze (born 1990), German footballer
- Kevin Wright (born 1995), English-Sierra Leonean footballer
- Kevin Yebo (born 1996), Ivorian-German basketballer
- Kevin Youkilis (born 1979), American baseball player
- Kevin Young (born 1961), English footballer
- Kevin John Wasserman (born 1963), American guitarist for The Offspring (better known as "Noodles")
- Kevin Zenón (born 2001), Argentine footballer
- Kevin Žižek (born 1998), Slovenian footballer

== Fictional ==
- Kevin, a character from the cartoon Ed, Edd n Eddy
- Kevin, a character in Frank Miller's Sin City yarns
- Kevin the Teenager, a character created and played by the comedian Harry Enfield
- Kevin Butler, a fictional character in Sony's "It Only Does Everything" PS3 marketing campaign
- Kevin Garvey, main character in the HBO television series The Leftovers
- Kevin Keene, the title character from the cartoon Captain N: The Game Master
- Kevin Khatchadourian, title character in the 2011 film We Need to Talk About Kevin and the 2003 book on which it is based
- Kevin Tran is a prophet on the television series Supernatural

== See also ==
- Caoimhe
- Caoimhin (Dungeons & Dragons), a fictional deity from Dungeons & Dragons
- German Kevinism
- Eugene – a name of Greek origin with a similar meaning
- Kelvin (disambiguation)
- Kevan
- Kevon
- List of Scottish Gaelic given names
- List of Irish-language given names
