= Kevan =

Kevan is a given name, a variant of the name Kevin (Caoimheán or Caomhán , an Irish diminutive form of Caoimhín; also anglicized Cavan). The feminine variant is Caoimhe (anglicised as Keeva or Kweeva).

Kevan is also an Irish surname, an anglicization of Ó Géibheannaigh (also rendered Keaveney) or Caomhánach.

== Given name ==
- Kevan Barbour (born 1949), international cricket umpire from Zimbabwe
- Kevan Barlow (born 1979), former American football running back
- Kevan Broadhurst (born 1959), English former professional footballer, coach and football manager
- Kevan Brown (born 1966), retired English professional footballer
- Kevan George (born 1990), Trinidadian footballer
- Kevan Gosper, AO (1933–2024), Australian athlete and administrator
- Kevan Guy (born 1965), Canadian former professional ice hockey player
- Kevan Hamilton (born 1934), former Australian rules footballer in the Victorian Football League
- Kevan Hurst (born 1985), English professional footballer
- Kevan James (born 1961), educated at the Edmonton County School, in the London Borough of Enfield
- Kevan Jones (born 1964), British Labour Party politician, Member of Parliament (MP) for North Durham since 2001
- Kevan Miller (born 1987), American professional ice hockey defenseman
- Kevan Smith (footballer) (born 1959), English former footballer
- Kevan Smith (baseball) (born 1988), American professional baseball catcher
- Kevan Tebay (1936–1996), English cricketer active from 1959 to 1963

== Surname ==
- Joseph Kevan (1855–1891), English cricketer active in 1875
- Douglas Keely Kevan (1895–1968) and his son D. K. M. Kevan (1920–1991), entomologists
- Derek Kevan (1935–2013), English footballer
- Martin Kevan (1947–2013), Canadian actor, voice actor, and author
- Dave Kevan (born 1968), former Scottish footballer

== Fictional characters ==
- Kevan Lannister, a fictional character in the A Song of Ice and Fire series of fantasy novels by American author George R. R. Martin and its television adaptation Game of Thrones. He is the younger brother of Tywin Lannister.
- Keevan (Star Trek)

== See also ==
- Caomhán of Inisheer
- Caomhán mac Connmhach
- Kevin, given name
- Kevon, given name
- Kavin, given name
- KVAN (disambiguation)
- Keyvan (disambiguation)
- Klevan
