= Kevin (disambiguation) =

Kevin is a common male first name of the Irish origin.

Kevin may also refer to:

- Kevinism, the tendency of parents in German-speaking areas to name their children with what appears to them to be unusual, exotic-sounding first names
- Kevin, Montana, a town in the United States
- Kevin ZP98, a semi-automatic subcompact pistol manufactured in the Czech Republic
- "Kevin", a song from This Unruly Mess I've Made, 2016
- "Kevin (Skit)", a song from ADHD (Joyner Lucas album), 2020
- A giant bird in Disney's Up (2009 film)
- "Kevin" an adult animated comedy show on Amazon Prime Video created by Aubrey Plaza and Joe Wengert

== See also ==
- We Need to Talk About Kevin, winner of the 2003 Orange Prize for fiction
- Kelvin (disambiguation)
- Kevon, a name
- Kavin, an Indian male given name
