= Kévin =

Kévin is a masculine given name.

The name, which is a respelling of the Celtic-origin name Kevin, became popular in France in the 1990s. Although the true reasons for its popularity are unclear, this may have been due to the influence of U.S. films, which featured celebrities of the time like Kevin Costner, Kevin McCallister, Kevin Bacon, or Kevin Spacey. However, it has since been stereotyped and associated with working-class families. When the BBC Europe correspondent Kevin Connolly lived in Paris, his office settled on the pronunciation of K'veen, even though Connolly himself would have preferred the pronunciation Ke-van.

In June 2022, Kévin Mauvieux and Kévin Pfeffer, both from the National Rally, became the first people named "Kévin" to be elected to the Parliament of France in history. This was soon covered by Le Nouvel Obs, Le Point, and Le Républicain Lorrain.

Also in 2022, Kevin Fafournoux, who was born in 1987 in Clermont-Ferrand, began working on a film to be titled Savons les Kevin (lit. 'Save the Kevins').

== Notable people ==
- Kévin Afougou (born 1990), French footballer
- Kévin Ajax (born 1987), Guadeloupean footballer
- Kévin Anin (born 1986), French footballer
- Kévin Appin (born 1998), Martiniquais footballer
- Kévin Aubeneau (born 1989), French footballer
- Kévin Aymoz (born 1997), French figure skater
- Kévin Azaïs, French actor
- Kévin Barralon (born 1982), French footballer
- Kévin Barré (born 1990), French footballer
- Kévin Bodin (born 1987), French footballer
- Kévin Boli (born 1991), Ivorian footballer
- Kévin Boma (born 2002), Togolese footballer
- Kévin Bonnefoi (born 1991), French handball player
- Kévin Bouly, French weightlifter
- Kévin Bozon (born 1995), French ice hockey player
- Kévin Bru (born 1988), Association football player
- Kévin Bérigaud (born 1988), French footballer
- Kévin Cabral (born 1999), French footballer
- Kévin Campion (born 1988), French racewalker
- Kévin Constant (born 1987), Guinean footballer
- Kévin Dagnet (born 1995), French footballer
- Kévin Danois (born 2004), French footballer
- Kévin das Neves (born 1986), French footballer
- Kévin Denkey (born 2000), Togolese footballer
- Kévin Diaz (footballer, born 1983), French footballer
- Kévin Diaz (footballer, born 1988), French footballer
- Kévin Dinal, French basketball player
- Kévin Diogo (born 1991), French footballer
- Kévin Dupuis (born 1987), French footballer
- Kévin Estre (born 1967), French racing driver
- Kévin Farade (born 1995), French footballer
- Kévin Fortuné (born 1989), Footballer
- Kévin Gemin (born 1992), French animator
- Kévin Goba (born 1987), French footballer
- Kévin Gohiri (born 1986), French footballer
- Kévin Gomis (born 1989), French-Senegalese footballer
- Kévin Hautcœur, French middle-distance runner
- Kévin Hecquefeuille, French ice hockey coach and former player
- Kévin Hoggas (born 1991), French footballer
- Kévin Jacmot (born 1984), French footballer
- Kévin Keben (born 2004), Cameroonian footballer
- Kévin Koubemba (born 1993), Congolese footballer
- Kévin Labèque, French cyclist
- Kévin Lacroix (footballer) (born 1984), French footballer
- Kévin Lalouette, French cyclist
- Kévin Le Cunff (born 1988), French cyclist
- Kévin Le Roux (born 1989), French volleyball player
- Kévin Ledanois (born 1993), French road cyclist
- Kévin Lejeune (born 1985), French footballer
- Kévin Lele Sadjo (born 1990), French boxer
- Kévin Malaga (born 1987), French footballer
- Kévin Malcuit (born 1991), French footballer
- Kévin Malpon (born 1996), Guadeloupean footballer
- Kévin Mauvieux, French politician
- Kévin Mayi (born 1993), Gabonese footballer
- Kévin Mbala (born 2001), French footballer
- Kévin Menaldo (born 1992), French pole vaulter
- Kévin Mondeko, Congolese professional footballer
- Kévin Monnet-Paquet (born 1988), French footballer
- Kévin Monzialo (born 2000), Congolese footballer
- Kévin Mouanga (born 2000), French footballer
- Kévin N'Doram (born 1996), French footballer
- Kévin Nicaise (born 1985), Chadian footballer
- Kévin Olimpa (born 1988), Martiniquais footballer
- Kévin Oliveira, Cape Verdean footballer
- Kévin Parsemain (born 1988), Martiniquais footballer
- Kévin Pedro, French footballer
- Kévin Perrot (born 1989), French footballer
- Kévin Pfeffer, French politician
- Kévin Renaut (born 1991), French footballer
- Kévin Reza, French racing cyclist
- Kévin Rimane (born 1991), French Guianan footballer
- Kévin Rocheteau (born 1993), French footballer
- Kévin Rodrigues (born 1994), Footballer
- Kévin Rouet
- Kévin Schur (born 1990), French footballer
- Kévin Sireau, French cyclist
- Kévin Sommer (born 1989), French footballer
- Kévin Soni (born 1998), Cameroonian footballer
- Kévin Szalaï, French motorcycle racer
- Kévin Testud (born 1992), French association footballer
- Kévin Thobois, French motorcycle racer
- Kévin Théophile-Catherine (born 1989), French footballer
- Kévin Tillie (born 1990), French volleyball player
- Kévin Van Melsen, Belgian road cyclist
- Kévin Vandendriessche (born 1989), French footballer
- Kévin Vauquelin (born 2001), French cyclist
- Kévin Yann (born 1989), French footballer
- Kévin Yoke (born 1996), French footballer
- Kévin Zohi, Ivorian-Malian footballer
- Kévin Zonzon (born 1989), French footballer
- Kévin Zougoula, Ivorian footballer
