= Kevin O'Sullivan =

Kevin O'Sullivan may refer to:

== Sport ==
- Kevin Jer O'Sullivan (born 1948), Irish Gaelic footballer for Adrigole, Beara and Cork
- Kevin O'Sullivan (Gaelic footballer) (born 1984), Irish Gaelic footballer for Ilen Rovers and Cork
- Kevin O'Sullivan (hurler) (born 1971), Irish hurler
- Kevin O'Sullivan (baseball) (born 1968), American college baseball coach and former player
- Kevin O'Sullivan (skier), New Zealand Paralympian

== Others ==
- Kevin O'Sullivan (politician) (born 1953), American politician and non-profit executive
- Kevin O'Sullivan (journalist) (born c. 1960), editor of The Irish Times
- Kevin O'Sullivan (actor)

== See also ==
- Kevin Sullivan (disambiguation)
