= Kevin Magee =

Kevin Magee may refer to:

- Kevin Magee (motorcyclist) (born 1962), Australian motorcycle road racer
- Kevin Magee (basketball) (1959–2003), American basketball player
- Kevin Magee (executive), American television executive
- Kevin Magee (footballer) (born 1971), Scottish footballer

== See also ==
- Kevin McGee, American politician
