= Caveney =

Caveney is a surname. It is a variant of Keaveney, derived from the Irish surname Mac Géibheannaigh.

Notable people with the surname include:

- Ike Caveney (1894–1949), American baseball player
- Mike Caveney (born 1950), American magician
- Philip Caveney (born 1951), British children's author
