= Kevin Parker (disambiguation) =

Kevin Parker (born 1986) is a singer and guitarist of the Australian psychedelic rock band Tame Impala.

Kevin Parker may also refer to:

- Kevin Parker (Australian footballer, born 1943), Australian footballer for South Melbourne
- Kevin Parker (Australian footballer, born 1945), Australian footballer for Fitzroy
- Kevin Parker (English footballer) (born 1979), English former footballer
- Kevin Parker (New York politician) (born 1967), New York State Senator
- Kevin Parker (Washington politician) (born 1973), member of the Washington House of Representatives
- Kevin Kit Parker, United States Army officer and professor at Harvard University
