= Welcome to the Neighbourhood =

Welcome to the Neighbourhood or Welcome to the Neighborhood may refer to:

- Welcome to the Neighbourhood (Meat Loaf album), a studio album by Meat Loaf
- Welcome to the Neighbourhood (Boston Manor album), a studio album by Boston Manor
- Welcome to the Neighborhood (TV series), an unaired television series
- "Welcome to the Neighborhood" (The 7D), a television episode
