= Kiva (name) =

Kiva is a name. Notable people with the name include:

== Given name ==
- Kiva Maidanik (1929–2006), Soviet historian and political scientist
- Kiva Reardon, Canadian film programmer, writer, editor, and commentator
- Kiva Simova, Canadian musician

== Middle name ==
- Charles Kiva Krieger (1914–1972), interim mayor of Jersey City, New Jersey
- Lloyd Kiva New (1916–2002), Cherokee fashion designer

== Surname ==
- Andriy Kiva (born 1989), former Ukrainian footballer
- Iya Kiva (born 1984), Ukrainian poet, translator, journalist, critic

== Fictional characters ==
- Kiva, a human Lucian Alliance commander in the television series Stargate Universe
- Kiva, a character in the animated television series Megas XLR

== See also ==
- Caoimhe, an Irish given name, anglicised Kiva
- Kiva (disambiguation)
