= Kevin Quigley =

Kevin Quigley may refer to:

- Kevin Quigley (politician), American politician, member of the Washington Senate
- Kevin F. F. Quigley, American higher education leader and non-profit executive
