= Kiva (disambiguation) =

A kiva is a room used by modern Puebloan people for religious rituals.

Kiva or KIVA may also refer to:

- Kiva (name), a list of people with the name

== Television ==
- KIVA (TV), a defunct television station in Yuma, Arizona
- KOBF, a television station in Farmington, New Mexico, which held the call sign KIVA-TV from 1972 to 1983
- Kamen Rider Kiva, a 2008 Japanese tokusatsu series

== Radio ==
- KIVA (AM), a radio station (1600 AM) licensed to Albuquerque, New Mexico, US
- KKRG-FM, a radio station (105.1 FM) licensed to Santa Fe, New Mexico, which held the call sign KIVA from 1985 to 1987, and the call sign KIVA-FM from 1987 to 1992
- KSSR-FM, a radio station (95.9 FM) licensed to Santa Rosa, New Mexico, known as KIVA from 2002 to 2009
- KQNM, a radio station (1550 AM) licensed to Albuquerque, New Mexico, which held the call sign KIVA from 2009 to 2012

== Organisations ==
- Kiva (organization), a non-profit organization that promotes development through microcredit
- Kiva Systems, now Amazon Robotics, an automated warehousing systems and robotics company

== Places ==
- False Kiva, human-made stone circle of unknown origin
- Kiva Auditorium, part of the Albuquerque Convention Center
- Kiva Dunes, a golf course in Alabama, United States
- Kiva, Estonia, a village in Estonia
- Khanate of Kiva, a former Central Asian kingdom
- Kiva, Michigan, an unincorporated community in Michigan, United States

== Other uses ==
- Caoimhe, an Irish given name, anglicised Kiva
- Kiva (album), 1995 ambient music album by Steve Roach, Michael Stearns and Ron Sunsinger
- KIVA (software), a family of Computational Fluid Dynamics software developed by Los Alamos National Laboratory

== See also ==
- Khiva (disambiguation)
- Kivas Tully (1820–1905), Irish-Canadian architect
