= Kevin López =

Kevin López may refer to:

- Kevin López (runner) (born 1990), Spanish runner
- Kevin López (footballer) (born 1996), Honduran footballer
- Kevin Marron Lopez (born 1989), Italian vert skater
