= Kevin Sullivan =

Kevin Sullivan may refer to:

== Arts and media ==
- Field Medic (born 1991), American musician born Kevin Patrick Sullivan
- Kevin Sullivan (artist) (born 1964), performance artist, painter
- Kevin Sullivan (journalist) (born 1959), Pulitzer Prize-winning Washington Post journalist
- Kevin Sullivan (producer) (born c. 1955), Canadian director and producer of film and television
- Kevin M. Sullivan (born 1955), true crime author
- Kevin Rodney Sullivan (born 1958), actor and film director

== Politics ==
- Kevin Sullivan (communications professional) (born 1958), former White House Director of Communications
- Kevin Sullivan (politician) (born 1949), 106th Lieutenant Governor of Connecticut
- Kevin J. Sullivan (mayor) (born 1959), Massachusetts politician
- Kevin K. Sullivan (born 1964), American diplomat

== Sports ==
- Kevin Sullivan (footballer) (1922–1972), Australian footballer for Collingwood
- Kevin Sullivan (runner) (born 1974), middle-distance runner
- Kevin Sullivan (wrestler) (1949–2024), professional wrestler

== Other people ==
- Kevin J. Sullivan (computer scientist), professor of computer science at University of Virginia
- Kevin Sullivan (pilot), captain of Qantas Flight 72

== See also ==
- Kevin O'Sullivan (disambiguation)
