= Khiva (disambiguation) =

Khiva is a city in Xorazm Region, Uzbekistan.

Khiva may also refer to:

- FK Khiva, a football club based in Khiva
- Khanate of Khiva, a former Central Asian polity
- Khiva District, an Uzbek district encompassing Khiva

== See also ==
- Kiva (disambiguation)
