= Kevyn =

Kevyn is a given name, a spelling variant of Kevin (occasionally used as feminine).

== People named Kevyn ==
=== Male ===
- Kevyn Adams (born 1974), retired professional ice hockey center in the National Hockey League
- Kevyn Aucoin (1962–2002), American make-up artist and photographer
- Kevyn Major Howard (1956–2025), Canadian actor and photographer
- Kevyn Ista (born 1984), Belgian road bicycle racer
- Kevyn Lucas (born 1997), Brazilian footballer
- Kevyn Morrow, American actor, originally from Nebraska

=== Female ===
- Kevyn Lettau (born 1959), Brazilian jazz vocalist
- Kevyn Stafford (born 1964), Canadian sprint canoeist who competed in the early 1990s

=== Fictional ===
- Kevyn Andreyasn, a fictional character from the webcomic Schlock Mercenary

== See also ==
- Kevin
- Kevon
- KEVY
