= Kevin Hayes (disambiguation) =

Kevin Hayes (born 1992) is an American ice hockey player.

Kevin Hayes may also refer to:

- Kevin Hayes (footballer) (1924–2011), Australian rules footballer
- Kevin Hayes (cricketer) (born 1962), English cricketer
- Kevin Hayes (hurler) (born 1984), Irish hurler
- Kevin Hayes, Constitution Party of the United States candidate for US Senate in 2024

== See also ==
- Kevin Hays (born 1968), American jazz pianist and composer
- Kevin Hays (speedcuber) (born 1994), American Rubik's Cube speedcuber
