= Kevin McDonald (disambiguation) =

Kevin McDonald (born 1961) is a Canadian comedian and actor.

Kevin McDonald or Kevin MacDonald may also refer to:

- Kevin McDonald (bishop) (born 1947), Roman Catholic Archbishop of Southwark, England
- Kevin McDonald (footballer, born 1981), retired Scottish footballer
- Kevin McDonald (footballer, born 1985), English footballer
- Kevin McDonald (footballer, born 1988), Scottish footballer
- Kevin McDonald (hurler) (born 1997), Irish hurler
- Kevin McDonald (rugby league) (1936–2014), Australian rugby player
- Kevin MacDonald (artist) (1947–2006), Washington, DC–based artist
- Kevin Macdonald (director) (born 1967), Scottish film director
- Kevin MacDonald (evolutionary psychologist) (born 1944), American white supremacist, conspiracy theorist, and evolutionary psychologist
- Kevin MacDonald (footballer) (born 1960), Scottish football player for Liverpool
- Kevin MacDonald (ice hockey) (born 1966), Canadian ice hockey player

== See also ==
- Keven McDonald (1956–2026), American basketball player
