= Kevon =

Kevon is a given name of Irish origin. Notable people with the name include:

- Kevon Boodie (born 1993), Guyanese cricketer
- Kevon Carter (1983–2014), Trinidadian soccer player
- Kevon Clement (born 1983), Trinidadian football player
- Kevon Cooper (born 1989), Trinidadian cricket player
- Kevon Edmonds (born 1958), American singer and actor
- Kevon Fubler (born 1992), Bermudian cricketer
- Kevon Glickman (born 1960), American music producer and entertainment lawyer
- Kevon Looney (born 1996), American basketball player
- Kevon Neaves (born 1985), Trinidadian soccer player
- Kevon Pierre (born 1982), Trinidadian sprinter
- Kevon Smith (born 1955), American musician, singer-songwriter, and record producer
- Kevon Villaroel (born 1987), Trinidadian football player

== See also ==
- Kevin
- Kevan
- Kevyn
