= Kevin Mitchell =

Kevin Mitchell may refer to:

== Sports ==
- Kevin Mitchell (Australian rules footballer) (born 1945), Australian footballer
- Kevin Mitchell (baseball) (born 1962), American baseball player and 1989 National League MVP
- Kevin Mitchell (boxer) (born 1984), English boxer
- Kevin Mitchell (ice hockey) (born 1980), American professional ice hockey player
- Kevin Mitchell (linebacker) (1971–2007), NFL football player
- Kevin Mitchell (motorcyclist) (born 1961), former British Grand Prix motorcycle road racer
- Kevin Mitchell (safety) (born 1985), currently a free agent in the National Football League
- Kevin Mitchell (water polo) (born 1981), Canadian water polo player

== Other ==
- Kevin Mitchell (musician) (born 1977), lead singer of the Australian rock band Jebediah, also known as Bob Evans
