= Kavin =

Kavin (/kəvɪn/)(Tamil கவின்) is a unisex given name, which is Tamil for "beauty", "grace", "fairness" or "comeliness". Notable people with the name include:

== People ==
- Kavinn (born 1984), Jamaican football player
- Kavin Dave (born 1984), Indian actor
- Kavin Jayaram (born 1980), Malaysian comedian
- Kav Sandhu (born 1979), British musician
- Kavin (actor) (born 1990), Indian film and television actor
- Kavin Bharti Mittal (born 1987), Internet entrepreneur

== See also ==
- Kevin
- Kevan
