= Kevin Diaz =

Kevin or Kévin Diaz is the name of:

- Kévin Diaz (footballer, born 1983), former French footballer
- Kévin Diaz (footballer, born 1988) French footballer currently playing in France for Istres
