= Welcome to the Neighborhood (TV series) =

2005 reality television series

- Genre: Reality television
- Narrated by: David O'Brien
- Country of origin: United States
- Original language: English
- No. of seasons: 1
- No. of episodes: 6

Production
- Executive producers: Rob Lee; Chuck Bangert; Lou Gorfain; Jay Blumenfield; Tony Marsh
- Production location: Austin, Texas
- Running time: 1 hour
- Production companies: MGM; New Screen Concepts; Jay and Tony Show

Original release
- Network: ABC
- Release: July 10, 2005 (unaired)

Welcome to the Neighborhood is an unaired American reality television series planned for broadcast by ABC. The series was set to premiere on July 10, 2005, for a six-episode run, although it was abruptly removed from the ABC schedule only ten days before its planned broadcast. The series depicted a group of seven diverse families in competition for a lavish house in Circle C Ranch, an upscale subdivision of Austin, Texas. In order to win the competition, the families were required to participate in a series of interviews, challenges, and social interactions, which were judged by a panel of three conservative white families that resided in Circle C Ranch. These judging families eliminated a competing family from the competition each week; the competing family that remained at the end of the competition was awarded the house and became a part of the Circle C Ranch community. The series was narrated by American voice actor David O'Brien.

Welcome to the Neighborhood was met with fierce backlash from television critics and advocacy groups. Many television critics deemed the series an "embarrassing debacle" while advocacy groups—including GLAAD, the Family Research Council (FRC), and the National Fair Housing Alliance (NFHA)—believed it was a cause for concern. The groups claimed that the series promoted intolerance toward minority groups, with the NFHA further alleging violations of the Fair Housing Act. The NFHA threatened to commence litigation against ABC if the series was broadcast. On June 30, 2005, ABC shelved the series due to "sensitivity of the subject matter". However, producers alleged that the series was cancelled as a business decision by ABC's owner, the Walt Disney Company. ABC considered the broadcast of a condensed version of the series, although the network ultimately decided against this option. In 2007, an adaptation of Welcome to the Neighborhood premiered in Germany on RTL II, which aired for nearly two full seasons.

== Format ==
Contestant Steve Wright (right) with judge Jim Stewart (center) in Circle C Ranch

The series depicted a competition among seven diverse families for a house in Circle C Ranch, an upscale subdivision of Austin, Texas. These competing families included a religious African-American family (the Crenshaws); a white Wiccan family (the Eckhardts); a boisterous Latino family (the Gonzalezes); an Asian family that owned a sushi restaurant (the Lees); a conservative white tattoo-covered family (the Sheets); a white gay couple with an adopted African-American infant (the Wrights); and a white family whose matriarch is a stripper (the Morgans). In order to win the house—a 3,300-square-foot (310 m^{2}), four-bedroom, 2.5-bath structure valued at over $300,000—the competing families were required to gain the approval of three conservative white families that resided in Circle C Ranch (the Stewarts, Daniels, and Bellamys). The competing families were required to participate in a series of interviews, challenges, and social interactions that were meant to illustrate how well they would assimilate into the neighborhood. Some of the challenges included setting up carnival booths on the cul-de-sac and decorating lawns. The performance of the competing families was evaluated by the panel of judging families, who eliminated a competing family from the competition each week. If a competing family won a challenge, then they were given a "free pass" that exempted them from elimination that week. The competing family that remained at the end of the competition was awarded the house and became a part of the Circle C Ranch community. The series was narrated by American voice actor David O'Brien.

== Announcement and reception ==
On April 27, 2005, ABC sent out a press release for Welcome to the Neighborhood. Set to air from July 10 to August 14, 2005, the series was intended as a summer replacement for Desperate Housewives. The release emphasized the traditional nature of the Circle C Ranch residents, in which it claimed that the judging families "are used to a certain kind of neighbor—one who looks and thinks just like them [sic]". The series was heavily promoted, with advertisements similarly emphasizing the nontraditional nature of the competing families. In one of the commercials, Jim Stewart, the head of one of the judging families, stated "I will not tolerate a homosexual couple coming into this neighborhood". The advertisements for Welcome to the Neighborhood quickly drew criticism from media commentators and civil rights groups, who deemed the series as racist and homophobic.

I think for America to see everyone on the block, not just me, transformed and confronting their prejudices, it would benefit the gay community and other contestants. Feelings unfolded and were released in ways I don't think will be captured again.

— Jim Stewart, one of the judges, discussing his experience on the series with The Advocate

Many television critics deemed the series an "embarrassing debacle", with Dalton Ross of Entertainment Weekly referring to the first couple of episodes as "simply challenging to watch". Several advocacy groups—including GLAAD, the Family Research Council (FRC), and the National Fair Housing Alliance (NFHA)—believed the series was a cause for concern. GLAAD condemned the intolerance toward gay men depicted in the first few episodes; the organization claimed that the competition was "unnecessarily cruel and insensitive". However, GLAAD never called for the series to be cancelled, and it believed that the producers had "admirable" intentions. The NFHA criticized producers for awarding a house on the basis of race, religion, and sexual orientation; the organization further alleged that the series potentially violated the Fair Housing Act. Shanna Smith, the president of the NFHA, stated that the organization was prepared to commence litigation against ABC if it broadcast the series. The FRC expressed concern that Welcome to the Neighborhood might portray evangelicals as "judgmental and foolish". The series also experienced backlash from right-wing activists, who claimed it was "unbalanced" against conservatives.

Several residents of Circle C Ranch expressed their own frustrations with the negative reception the series garnered. John and Steve Wright, the gay couple with an adopted African-American son, ultimately won the series and moved into Circle C Ranch; the Wrights claimed that the series portrayed a gay couple in a positive light and were "devastated" that viewers would not witness this depiction. The Wrights had hoped that Welcome to the Neighborhood would provide positive representation of a gay couple for young LGBT viewers. Stewart believed that the advertisements for Welcome to the Neighborhood unfairly portrayed the residents of Circle C Ranch as "one-dimensional characters"; he claimed that a full viewing of the series added more depth to the neighborhood's residents. Stewart further explained that the series allowed him to overcome his own homophobia and to reconnect with his estranged gay son. Several residents of Circle C Ranch posted on online community bulletin boards over their concern that the series's negative press may tarnish the neighborhood's reputation and lower property values. According to Faye Rencher, a black woman who moved into Circle C Ranch shortly after the series's announcement, the advertisements "painted the neighborhood like they were these judgmental, upper-class, white suburban people". Rencher explained, however, that she was misled by the advertisements; she believed the neighborhood was "real nice" and ultimately shared common ground with many of its residents.

== Cancellation ==
On June 30, 2005, ABC announced that it had shelved the series due to "sensitivity of the subject matter". An ABC spokesperson defended the network's intention to "confront preconceived notions" with Welcome to the Neighborhood; however, they also acknowledged that viewers might find the intolerance depicted in the first few episodes difficult to watch. This cancellation was announced only ten days before the series was set to premiere. Despite the fierce backlash that Welcome to the Neighborhood received from advocacy groups, Steve McPherson, the president of ABC Entertainment, claimed that these protests had no impact on its cancellation. The network was confident it had legal standing to give away a house as a reward, with McPherson further stating that the series simply "wasn't ready to go". Producers Bill and Eric Kennedy alleged that the series was shelved by the Walt Disney Company, ABC's owner, over concerns that Evangelical Christians would boycott the upcoming Disney film The Chronicles of Narnia: The Lion, the Witch and the Wardrobe. The Walt Disney Company wanted to build support for the film among religious groups who had recently lifted boycotts against the company; the company allegedly feared that the portrayal of evangelicals and gay men in Welcome to the Neighborhood would complicate religious support for the film. ABC spokesperson Kevin Brockman rebutted the Kennedy's claims as "ludicrous".

The cancellation of Welcome to the Neighborhood was met with mixed reactions from advocacy groups. Some groups, such as the NHFA, were elated over its cancellation, while others, such as GLAAD, expressed interest in a revised version of the series. ABC explored the idea of broadcasting a condensed version of the series, which placed its "positive ending" in closer proximity to the "edgier early episodes". The network also received an offer from Fox Reality Channel to purchase the broadcasting rights for the series. While ABC was uncertain if it wanted to broadcast Welcome to the Neighborhood, McPherson rejected the idea of selling the series to another network. He stated, "If I don't think something should be aired, why would I sell it to somebody else?" In August 2009, Variety reported that ABC was still interested in broadcasting the series.

In October 2006, the Jay and Tony Show, one of the series's production companies, announced its plan to produce a new reality television show for Warner Horizon Television that was loosely inspired by Welcome to the Neighborhood. Producer Jay Blumenfield commented: "We wanted to take Welcome to the Neighborhood to the next level — and actually get it on the air". The series, which would have utilized audience response, focused on "build[ing] an entire town from scratch" and "learning about people and America".

== Adaptation ==
An adaptation of the series titled Willkommen in der Nachbarschaft (German; the English title is Welcome to the Neighborhood) was broadcast in Germany on RTL II. The series premiered on October 1, 2007, and ran for nearly two full seasons before its mid-season cancellation on September 15, 2008. Both seasons followed five diverse families in competition for an upscale house; the performance of the competing families was evaluated by nine judging families who resided in the neighborhood. The first season of Willkommen in der Nachbarschaft was set in Buckow, Berlin, and centered on a house valued at €250,000 (US$251,0923); the second season was set in Ruhr, North Rhine-Westphalia, and focused on a house valued at €300,000 (US$328,713). Willkommen in der Nachbarschaft premiered to 720,000 viewers, although its viewership decreased over the course of the series's run. Similar to the original series, Willkommen in der Nachbarschaft generally received negative reception, in which it was derided by media commentators, actors, and politicians. Many critics alleged that the series reinforced stereotypes and promoted prejudices against minority groups. RTL II's program director Axel Kühn defended the series, in which he claimed that the network never intended to discriminate against anyone. Despite this negative reception, the series received a nomination in the Reality category at the 2008 Rose d'Or.

== See also ==
- List of television series canceled before airing an episode
