= Kevin White =

Kevin White may refer to:

== Sports ==
- Kevin White (American football) (born 1992), American football player
- Kevin White (athletic director) (born 1950), athletic director of Duke University
- Kevin White (basketball) (born 1987), Australian basketball player
- Kevin White (cricketer) (born 1958), New Zealand cricketer
- Kevin White (darts player) (1938–2015), Australian darts player
- Kevin White (footballer) (1933–2023), Australian footballer
- Kevin White (skateboarder), (born 1993), American skateboarder

== Others ==
- Kevin White (politician) (1929–2012), mayor of Boston 1968–1984
- Kevin White, former guitarist for the band General Public
- Kevin White, former guitarist for the band Rise Against
