= Kevin Lacroix =

Kevin Lacroix may refer to:

- Kevin Lacroix (racing driver) (born 1989), Canadian racing driver
- Kévin Lacroix (footballer) (born 1984), French football player
