= Kevin O'Leary (disambiguation) =

Kevin O'Leary (born 1954) is a Canadian entrepreneur.

Kevin O'Leary may also refer to:

- Kevin O'Leary (judge) (1920–2015), Australian jurist
- Kevin O'Leary (poker player) (born 1969), UK poker professional
- Kevin O'Leary, peace officer involved in the Tatiana the Tiger incident
- Michael Kevin O'Leary, CEO of Ryanair
