= Circle C Ranch =

- Master-planned community
- Map of Circle C Ranch in Southwest Austin
- Location in the United States
- Coordinates: 30°11′15″N 97°53′27″W
- Country: United States
- State: Texas
- County: Travis
- City: Austin
- Developed: 1983
- Founder: Gary Bradley

Area
  - Total: 7.244 sq mi (18.76 km^{2})

Population
  - Total: 15,197
  - Density: 1,826/sq mi (705/km^{2})
- Time zone: UTC−06:00 (CST)
  - Summer (DST): UTC−05:00 (CDT)
- Zip code: 78739
- Area code: 512
- Website: www.circlecranch.com

Circle C Ranch (also known as Circle C) is a large master-planned community in southwest Austin, Texas, USA. Development of Circle C Ranch began in 1982, with the first homes in the community in built in 1986. During development, the subdivision was featured prominently in a long and contentious environmental legal battle regarding urban development in the vicinity of Barton Springs and over Edwards Aquifer. The controversy surrounding its development and later annexation by the city of Austin was a landmark in municipal annexation rights in Texas. Today, Circle C Ranch includes more than 5,620 homes.

== History ==
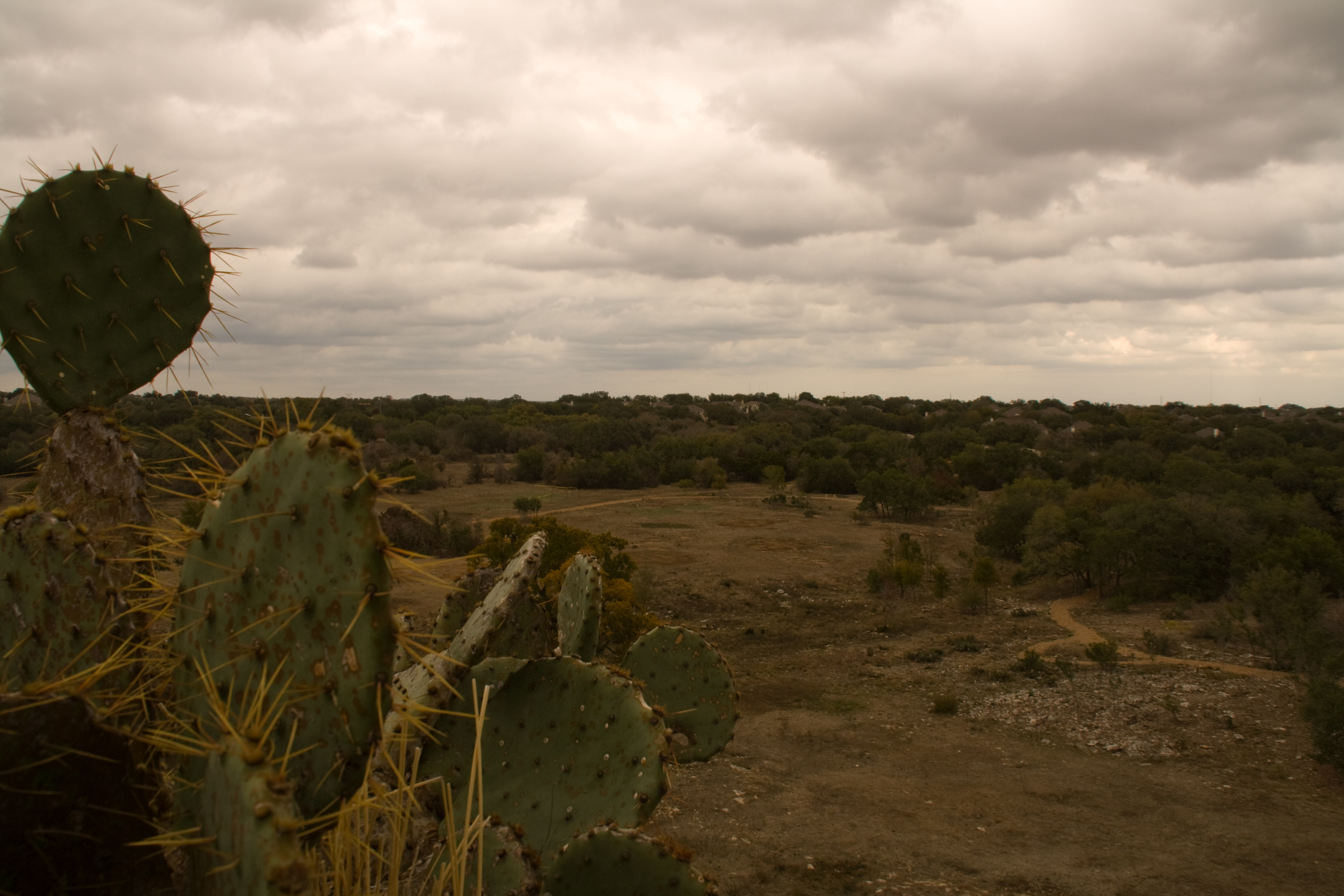
View of Lady Bird Johnson Wildflower Center, located in the eastern portions of Circle C Ranch

Development of Circle C Ranch began in 1982 when Gary Bradley, at the time a part-owner of the Schlotzsky's restaurant chain, and his development partners began to earn development permits and acquire land in southwest Austin, Texas. However, several local environmentalist groups including the Save Our Springs Alliance (SOS) were strongly opposed to the development due to the subdivision's planned location over the recharge zone of the Edwards Aquifer. Despite the strong opposition, the first homes in Circle C were built in 1986. In 1988, the Save Barton Creek Association filed a lawsuit against the Texas Highway Department in order to stop the extension of Texas State Highway Loop 1 into southwest Austin and to halt further development of Circle C Ranch. However, the subdivision's homeowner association was able to defend its rights to the land, and thus development continued.

By 1990, Circle C Ranch was considered the top selling subdivision in Central Texas. However, in the same year, the Gibraltar Savings and Loan bank based in California failed to pay off its debts, and all of its assets were transferred; at the time, this was one of the largest insolvencies in American history. Since the savings and loan company was the source for much of the money and resources involved in the development of Circle C Ranch, the subdivision went bankrupt and entered Chapter 11 reorganization status; reorganization was completed in 1992. Over the following years, several ordinances and lawsuits were filed in relation to Circle C Ranch and its environmental implications, resulting in the creation of the Southwest Travis County Water and Reclamation District in 1996 and the Slaughter Creek Water Protection Zone the following year. However, both the water district and protection zone were found unconstitutional because they were located within the City of Austin's extraterritorial jurisdiction and conflicted with the City's powers. On December 18, 1997, Circle C Ranch was involuntarily annexed by the City of Austin after roughly 15 years of development.

== Schools ==
All of Circle C Ranch is served by the Austin Independent School District. Portions of the Avaña section in Hays County are located in the Hays Consolidated Independent School District, but students there are allowed to attend AISD schools.

Circle C Ranch Zoned Public Schools
School	District	Established	Principal	Enrollment	Coordinates	Notes
Bear Creek Elementary	Austin ISD	2020	David Crissey	603	30°10′16.13″N 97°54′36.24″W	
Clayton Elementary	Austin ISD	2006	Karen McCollum	718	30°11′42.24″N 97°54′23.51″W	
Kiker Elementary	Austin ISD	1992	Cory Matheny	789	30°11′29.59″N 97°52′53.49″W	
Mills Elementary	Austin ISD	1997	Angela Frageman	776	30°12′39.52″N 97°52′41.62″W	
Gorzycki Middle	Austin ISD	2009	Sarah Tanner	1,329	30°12′51.84″N 97°53′30.86″W	
Bowie High	Austin ISD	1988	Mark Robinson	2,782	30°11′13.44″N 97°51′31.44″W	
Carpenter Hill Elementary	Hays CISD	2010	Ginger Bordeau	606	30°5′48.85″N 97°53′47.77″W	
Dahlstrom Middle	Hays CISD	1985	Dedrah Ginn	955	30°5′51.69″N 97°52′55.08″W	
Johnson High	Hays CISD	2019	Brett Miksch	2,452	30°5′57.29″N 97°53′33.37″W	

== In popular culture ==
The reality television series Welcome to the Neighborhood was set in Circle C Ranch, in which five families competed to win a house in the neighborhood.

== Sources ==
- FM Properties Inc. comments on Texas state legislature actions
- Bradley adds 976 acres (3.95 km^{2}) to Circle C
- Gary Bradley Will Not Get Away With Taking $73 Million from the Taxpayers to Build Circle C
- Houston's Long Shadow - Austin-Bashing: It's Not Over Yet
- Chasing Gary - To Annex or Not to Annex
- Ordinance annexing for full purposes the CIRCLE C ANNEXATION AREA - Austin City Council 12/11/97 Meeting item
- Hearing Reviews Limits on City Annexation and Development Powers - Texas House of Representatives
- Annexed citizens vs. City of Austin
- "Local Control"- Texas Style
- Boomtime in Austin, Texas: Negotiated Growth Management
- Bradley, city compromising
- City to pay about $10M in Circle C dispute
- A Revolt Brews Among the Circle C Masses
- Circle C Homeowners Association and City of Austin Settlement Agreement
- Reimbursement Claim Agreement between Circle C Land Corp. and City of Austin
- The Battle for the Springs: A Chronology
- Dotting i's, Circling C's - Simplifying the Tortured History of Circle C
- Austin developer Gary Lee Bradley - A Comprehensive Annotation
- Legal Proceedings - FM Properties Inc. Form 10-Q
- Save Our Springs Alliance and Circle C Neighborhood Assn v. City of Austin, Circle C Land Corp, and Stratus Properties
- Back In Black - SOS Is Arisen: Let the Confetti Rain Down
- Circle C golf club reinvents itself
- High Noon at the Circle C
