= Kevin Stewart =

Kevin Stewart may refer to:

- Kevin Stewart (Australian politician) (1928–2006), Australian politician
- Kevin Stewart (Scottish politician) (born 1968), Scottish politician
- Kevin Stewart (footballer) (born 1993), English footballer

== See also ==
- Kevin Stuart (1928–2005), New Zealand rugby union player
