= Kevin Phillips =

Kevin Phillips may refer to:

- Kevin Phillips (actor) (born 1981), American actor
- Kevin Phillips (Australian footballer) (1928–2018), Australian footballer for Collingwood
- Kevin Phillips (English footballer) (born 1973), former Sunderland and England football player
- Kevin Phillips (political commentator) (1940–2023), American political commentator and writer
- Kevin Phillips (politician) (1954–2017), Canadian politician
- Kevin Phillips (rugby union) (born 1961), Wales international rugby union player
- Kevin Phillips (high jumper), Welsh high jumper
