= Kevin Wilson =

Kevin Wilson may refer to:

- Kevin Bloody Wilson (born 1947), Australian comedian
- Kevin Wilson (actor), New Zealand born actor
- Kevin Wilson (American football) (born 1961), American football coach
- Kevin Wilson (footballer, born 1961), Northern Irish footballer
- Kevin Wilson (footballer, born 1976), Jamaican footballer
- Kevin Wilson (sailor) (born 1927), American Olympic sailor
- Kevin Wilson (skier) (born 1959), Puerto Rican Olympic skier
- Kevin Wilson (writer), American writer
- Kevin J. Wilson, Australian actor
- Kevin Wilson (game designer), American designer of board games and role-playing games
- Kevin Wilson Jr., American filmmaker
- Kevin James Wilson, 2D artist and art teacher
- Kevin Wilson (Ackley Bridge), fictional character

== See also ==
- Kelvin Wilson (born 1985), English footballer
