= Keith Kevan =

British zoologist and entomologist

Douglas Keith McEwan Kevan best known as Keith Kevan FRSE MIB (31 October 1920 – 9 July 1991) was a British zoologist and entomologist, who worked in Trinidad, East Africa and Canada. He published several books including on ethnoentomology and entomological poetry.

== Life and work ==
Kevan was born in Helsinki in Finland on 31 October 1920 during what is thought to have been an extended business trip on the part of his father, Douglas Keely Kevan, and his wife Gynnyth Paine. His father was an amateur conchologist and coleopterist while his mother was interested in botany and he too became interested in natural history at a young age. He was educated at George Watson's College in Edinburgh at both primary (prep school) and secondary levels, 1925 to 1937. He then studied Sciences at the University of Edinburgh graduating with a BSc in 1941. He left Britain during the Second World War and continued studies at Imperial College, St Augustin, in Trinidad under a Vans Dunlop scholarship. Influenced by Arthur Strickland he became interested in soil zoology. In 1943 he received the Associateship of the Imperial College of Agriculture and posted as entomologist to Kenya. During the war he served briefly and married Private Kathleen Luckin. In Kenya, he served with the East-African Anti-Locust Directorate and several times ate Benzene Hexachloride (BHC) publicly to demonstrate that it was harmless to humans.

In 1948, he resigned from African service and returned to Britain as a lecturer in agricultural zoology at the University of Nottingham. He gained a doctorate (PhD) in 1956. In 1958 he was elected a Fellow of the Royal Society of Edinburgh. His proposers were James Ritchie, Alexander David Peacock, Sir Michael Swann and Greville Friend. Later in 1958 he took the post of Professor of Zoology at McGill University in Canada. In 1971 he moved to be Director of the Lyman Entomological Museum in Quebec. He was President of the Entomological Society of Canada 1972–73. He was a member of Sigma Xi.

He had successful heart by-pass surgery in 1976 and retired in 1986. He died of a heart attack on 9 July 1991, and was survived by his wife Kathleen and three sons, Peter G. Kevan, Martin Kevan, and Simon Michael Kevan.

== Publications ==
- Soil Zoology (1955)
- Soil Animals (1962)
- Land of the Grasshoppers (1974)
- Land of the Locusts (1978)
