= Kevin Sheedy =

Kevin Sheedy may refer to:

- Kevin Sheedy (Irish footballer) (born 1959), Irish former footballer
- Kevin Sheedy (Australian footballer) (born 1947), Australian rules former football coach and player
