= Kevin Reynolds =

Kevin Reynolds may refer to:

- Kevin Reynolds (director) (born 1952)
- Kevin Reynolds (figure skater) (born 1990)
- Kevin Reynolds (priest) (active 2011)
- Kevin Reynolds (unionist) (active 1970s–present)
- Kevin Reynolds (first Gentleman of Iowa)
- Kevin Reynolds, fictional character from Supernoobs

== See also ==
- Kev Reynolds (1943–2021), English outdoor writer
- Kevin McReynolds (born 1959), American baseball player
