= Joseph Kevan =

English cricketer

Joseph Henry Kevan (13 September 1855 – 9 December 1891) was an English cricketer active in 1875 who played for Lancashire. He was born and died in Bolton. He appeared in two first-class matches, scoring 12 runs with a highest score of 12.
