= Kevin Mitchell (Australian rules footballer) =

Australian rules footballer (born 1945)

Personal information
- Full name: Kevin Mitchell
- Born: 28 February 1945
- Height: 173 cm (5 ft 8 in)
- Weight: 67 kg (148 lb)

Playing career^{1}
Years	Club	Games (Goals)
1964–65	Fitzroy	7 (0)
- ^{1} Playing statistics correct to the end of 1965.

Kevin Mitchell (born 28 February 1945) is a former Australian rules footballer who played with Fitzroy in the Victorian Football League (VFL).
