= Kevin Steuke =

German footballer

Personal information
- Date of birth: 23 November 1992 (age 33)
- Place of birth: Oberhausen, Germany
- Position: Attacking midfielder

Youth career
- –2011: Rot-Weiß Oberhausen

Senior career*
Years	Team	Apps	(Gls)
2011–2014	Rot-Weiß Oberhausen	41	(0)
2014–2015	TuS Koblenz	27	(4)
2015–2017	FC Kray	40	(4)
2017	SC Westfalia Herne	13	(5)
2017–2019	FC Kray	42	(12)
Total		163	(25)
- * Club domestic league appearances and goals

Kevin Steuke (born 23 November 1992) is a German former professional footballer who played as an attacking midfielder.
