= Kevin Magee (executive) =

American television executive

- Education: Temple University (BA)
- Occupation: Television executive

Kevin Magee is an American television executive who has worked for Yahoo Finance, MSNBC, Fox News, CNBC and ABC. At Yahoo Finance, he helped build out their online video programming. With MSNBC, he was executive-in-charge of the morning news show, Morning Joe. He came there from the Fox Business network. He joined the FOX Broadcasting group in 2001. He began his term as Senior Vice President of FOX News Radio in 2005. Chairman of FOX News Programming Council. Prior to Fox, he served as business news executive producer for CNBC from 1997–2001. He also worked for ABC News, as senior programming producer of Good Morning America from 1991–1997.

He won an Emmy Award in 1991 as part of the production team at Good Morning America which won the Best Talk Service category.

He was a writer/reporter KYW News Radio in Philadelphia. He is a graduate of Temple University with a B.A. in Communications. He is married with two children.
