= Kevin Rankin =

Kevin Rankin may refer to:

- Kevin Rankin (basketball) (born 1971), retired American/Turkish basketball player
- Kevin Rankin (actor) (born 1976), American actor
- Kevin Rankin, drummer with A Flock of Seagulls
