= Kevin Nugent =

Kevin Nugent may refer to:

- Kevin Nugent (ice hockey) (born 1955), American former ice hockey player
- Kevin Nugent (footballer) (born 1969), English former footballer and current manager
