= Kevin Marron Lopez =

Italian professional vert skater (born 1989)

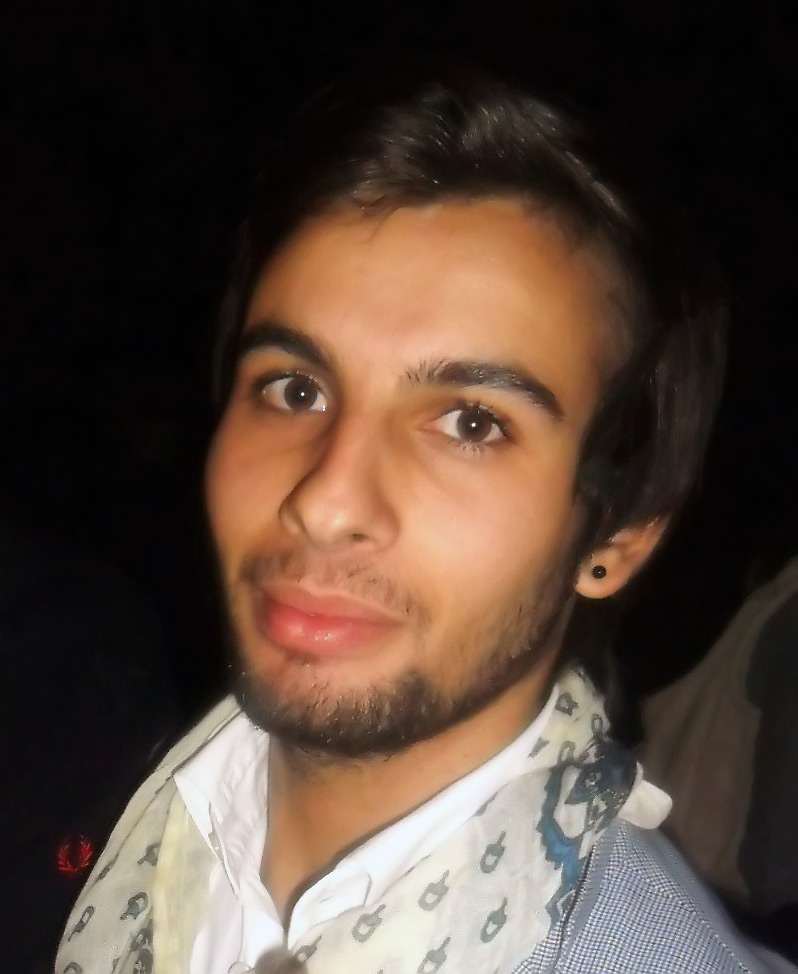

Personal information
- Nationality: Italian
- Born: March 18, 1989 (age 37) Milan, Italy

Sport
- Sport: Vert skating
Medal record
Competitions
Representing Belgium
Gold medal – first place	2005 European Challenge	Vert
Gold medal – first place	2004 Pomona, CA, USA	Vert

Kevin Marron Lopez is an Italian professional vert skater. Lopez started skating when he was 8 in 1997 and turned professional in 2004. Lopez has won many competitions in his vert skating career.

Best Tricks McTwist 900, McTwist 540

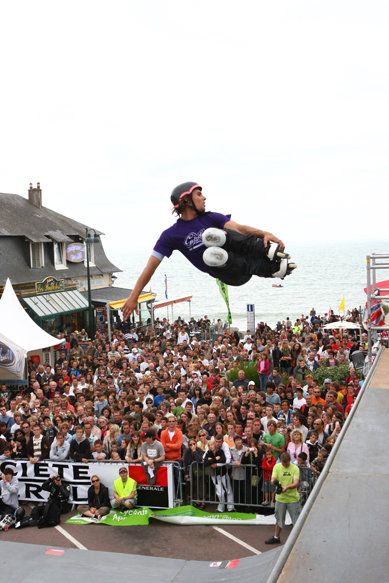
Kevin Vert Skating

== Vert Competitions ==
- 2006 LG Action Sports World Tour, Paris, France - Vert: 7th
- 2006 LG Action Sports World Tour, Berlin, Germany - Vert: 8th
- 2006 LG Action Sports World Tour, Birmingham, England - Vert: 6th
- 2006 LG Action Sports World Tour, Amsterdam, Netherlands - Vert: 6th
- 2005 LG Action Sports World Championship, Manchester, England - Vert: 6th
- 2005 LG Action Sports US Championship, Pomona, CA - Vert: 4th
- 2005 European Halfpipe Challenge: 1st
- 2005 Mobile Skatepark Series Tour, Cincinnati, OH: 6th
- 2005 Mobile Skatepark Series Tour, Sacramento, CA: 6th
- 2005 LG Action Sports Championships - Vert: 6th
- 2005 LG Action Sports Tour, Pomona, CA: 4th
- 2005 LG Action Sports Tour, Sacramento, CA: 6th
- 2004 World Championships Pomona, CA: 1st
