= Kevin King =

Kevin King may refer to:

- Kevin King (American football) (born 1995), American football player
- Kevin King (baseball) (born 1969), retired Major League Baseball player
- Kevin King (politician) (1922–1983), Australian politician
- Kevin King (rugby league) (born 1985), rugby league player
- Kevin King (tennis) (born 1991), American tennis player
- Kevin King (runner), winner of the 1985 3000 meters at the NCAA Division I Indoor Track and Field Championships
- Kevin King, American professor wrongfully detained in Afghanistan
