= Kevin Sandoval =

Kevin Sandoval may refer to:

- Kevin Sandoval (Guatemalan footballer) (born 1962)
- Kevin Sandoval (Peruvian footballer) (born 1997)
