= Kevin Moran =

Kevin Moran may refer to:

- Kevin Moran (footballer) (born 1956), Irish association football and Gaelic football player
- Kevin Moran (hurler) (born 1987), Irish hurler presently playing with Waterford GAA
- Kevin Moran (politician) (born 1968), Irish politician
- Kevin Moran (squash player) (born 1990), Scottish squash player.
- Kevin Moran, former bassist for ZAO
