= Kevin St. Onge =

Kevin St. Onge was the Guinness World Record holder for throwing a single playing card, from 1979 to 1992. He was originally from Dearborn, Michigan and set the record on June 12, 1979, throwing the card 185 feet and one inch. This broke the previous record, set in 1978, by himself, of 172 feet. His record was beat in 1992, at 201 feet and this is the current world record.

St. Onge, now retired from entertainment, was also a magical performer and science show presenter, performing at assemblies as "Dr. Zap".

Additionally, he designed and built many of his own stage illusions, most of which were sold off and are either in collections, or being used by other performers; many of whom are in the Michigan area.
