= Kevin McHale =

Kevin McHale may refer to:

- Kevin McHale (footballer) (born 1939), English footballer
- Kevin McHale (basketball) (born 1957), American basketball player, coach, and executive
- Kevin McHale (actor) (born 1988), American actor and singer
