= Kevin Ramírez =

Kevin Ramírez may refer to:

- Kevin Ramírez (footballer, born 1993), Peruvian midfielder for Willy Serrato
- Kevin Ramírez (footballer, born 1994), Uruguayan midfielder for Club Atlético Tigre
- Kevin Ramírez (footballer, born 1998), Mexican midfielder for Club Atlético Zacatepec
- Kevin Ramírez (footballer, born 2002), Guatemalan midfielder for C.D. Malacateco
