= Kevin Werdelmann =

Slowtide
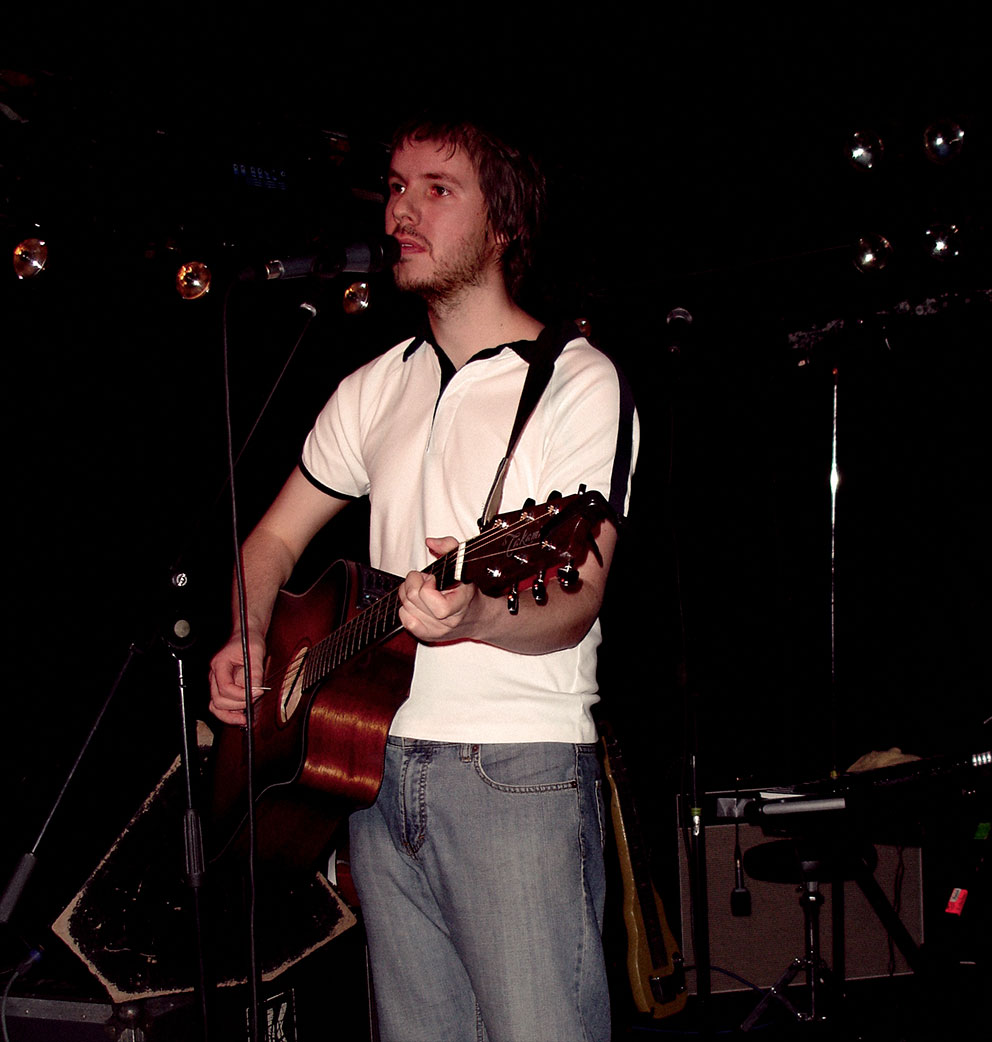

Background information
- Origin: Bochum, Germany
- Genres: Indie pop, Synth-pop, Chamber pop
- Years active: 2002 - Present
- Labels: Timezone Records, Marchpane Records
- Members: Kevin Werdelmann
- Website: www.slowtide.com

Kevin Werdelmann, also known by his stage name Slowtide, is a German songwriter and musician.

== History ==
Influenced by Vince Clarke and Chris Hülsbeck, Kevin Werdelmann produced his first songs and soundtracks to self-made films on an Amiga 500 homecomputer at an early age. His first step into public took place with the self-released electronic instrumental album London, on which he processed the impressions of his first visit to the british metropolis in 1997. He soon evolved into a multi-instrumentalist and made his first appearance as a singer on the two demo EPs Time Escape (2001) and Things That Fade (2002). The artistname Slowtide was formed and numerous live appearances followed since then, which saw him share the stage with bands like British Sea Power, Gravenhurst, Eskobar, Hjaltalin and Belasco. He also appeared at the renown Reeperbahnfestival in Hamburg in 2007.

His official debut album Origins was released in January 2009 by Marchpane Records and was received positively by the press. It was chosen as the album of the month in issue 01/2009 of Kulturnews magazine.

The self-produced second album Solaria was released in August 2012 by Timezone Records. The first official music video for the song Aimless was produced the same year and a music video for the song California followed in 2017.

Celebrating its 20th anniversary the instrumental album London from 1997 received a digital re-release on November 3, 2017.

His third album A Gentle Reminder was released in November 2018 by Timezone Records. It contains new studio versions of songs from the demo EPs "Time Escape" and "Things That Fade".

== Discography ==
=== Albums ===
- 2009: Origins (CD/Digital, Marchpane Records)
- 2012: Solaria (CD/Digital, Timezone Records)
- 2018: A Gentle Reminder (CD/Digital, Timezone Records)

=== Singles / EPs ===
- 2001 Time Escape (CD, self-released)
- 2002 Things That Fade (CD, self-released)
- 2012 In The Hall Of The Mountain King (Digital), Arrangement of the piece by Edvard Grieg
- 2020 Ship Of Fools (Digital), cover version of a song by Erasure
- 2025 Where It Began (Digital)

=== as Kevin Werdelmann ===
- 1997 London (CD, self-released) (Digital re-release 2017)

=== Remixes for other artists ===
- 2007 Erasure - "When A Lover Leaves You (Slowtide Remix)" (Remix Contest)
- 2010 Andy Bell - "Say What You Want (Slowtide Remix)" (Remix Contest)
- 2012 Tommy Finke - "Canossa (Slowtide Remix)"
- 2014 Atomic - "Come Closer (Slowtide Remix)", "Black Angels (Slowtide Remix)", "Don't Rip It Up (Slowtide Remix)" on Heartbeater - The Remix Album
