= Kevin Parker (Australian footballer, born 1943) =

Australian rules footballer

Personal information
- Full name: Kevin Francis Parker
- Born: 2 May 1943 (age 83)
- Original team: Colac
- Height: 178 cm (5 ft 10 in)
- Weight: 76 kg (168 lb)

Playing career^{1}
Years	Club	Games (Goals)
1964–1966	South Melbourne	20 (0)
- ^{1} Playing statistics correct to the end of 1966.

Kevin Francis Parker (born 2 May 1943) is a former Australian rules footballer who played with South Melbourne in the Victorian Football League (VFL).

Originally from Colac, he played as a rover or back pocket
