= Kevin Matthews =

Kevin Matthews may refer to:

- Kevin Matthews (writer) (1911–1968), pseudonym of the American writer Gardner Fox
- Kevin Matthews (radio personality) (born 1956), American radio personality
- Kevin Matthews (politician) (born 1960), American politician in Oklahoma
- Kevin Matthews (wrestler) (born 1983), American professional wrestler
- Kevin Matthews (American football) (born 1987), American football center

== See also ==
- Kevin Mathews (born 1961), Singaporean singer-songwriter
