= Kevin DeShields =

American football player (born 2000)

Oregon Lightning
- Position: Defensive lineman

Personal information
- Born: August 7, 2000 (age 26); Bridgeton, New Jersey, U.S.
- Listed height: 6 ft 3 in (1.91 m)
- Listed weight: 300 lb (136 kg)

Career information
- High school: Vineland (Cumberland County, New Jersey)
- College: Lackawanna (2018–2019); Delaware State (2020–2021)
- NFL draft: 2023: undrafted

Kevin DeShields Jr. (born August 7, 2000), is an American football defensive lineman for the Oregon Lightning. He played college football for Lackawanna and Delaware State.

== Early life ==
DeShields was born as one of six children, to Demetrias Fletcher and Kevin Deshields Sr. He has two brothers and three sisters. He attended Vineland High School where he played as a defensive tackle for the Vineland Bulldogs football team. By his senior year during the 2017–2018 season, DeShields totaled 43 tackles. His varsity performances during his junior and senior seasons also earned him letters. DeShields intended to enroll at his dream college of Rutgers University. However, his inferior grades prevented him from receiving any scholarship considerations.

== College career ==
DeShields attended Lackawanna College for the 2018-2019 semester. He played nose guard for the Lackawanna Falcons. During the 2019 season, he played in five games and totaled 5 tackles including 3 solo tackles and 2 assists. While at Lackawanna, DeShields vastly improved his grade point average, elevated from 1.6 to 3.46. He helped the Falcons to New England Fathering Conference (NEFC) conference championships during his two seasons at Lackawanna. While at Lackawanna, DeShields visited Rutgers University after the Scarlet Knights football team sought to increase the depth of its defensive line chart.

DeShields enrolled at the HBCU school of Delaware State University where he played as a defensive lineman for the Hornets football team. During the COVID-19-impacted 2020–2021 season, DeShields played in all 5 total games as a starting lineman. He totaled 9 tackles including 8 unassisted tackles. In the fall 2021 season, DeShields played his first full season of college football since joining Delaware. After 11 games played, DeShields totaled 18 tackles and his season performance earned him a Mid-Eastern Athletic Conference (MEAC) Special Teams Player of the Week accolade. While attending DSU, DeShields majored in Management and minored in Criminal Justice. He declared for the 2023 NFL draft.

== Professional career ==
On October 24, 2024, it was announced DeShields signed with the Oregon Lightning.
