= Kévin Dinal =

French basketball player

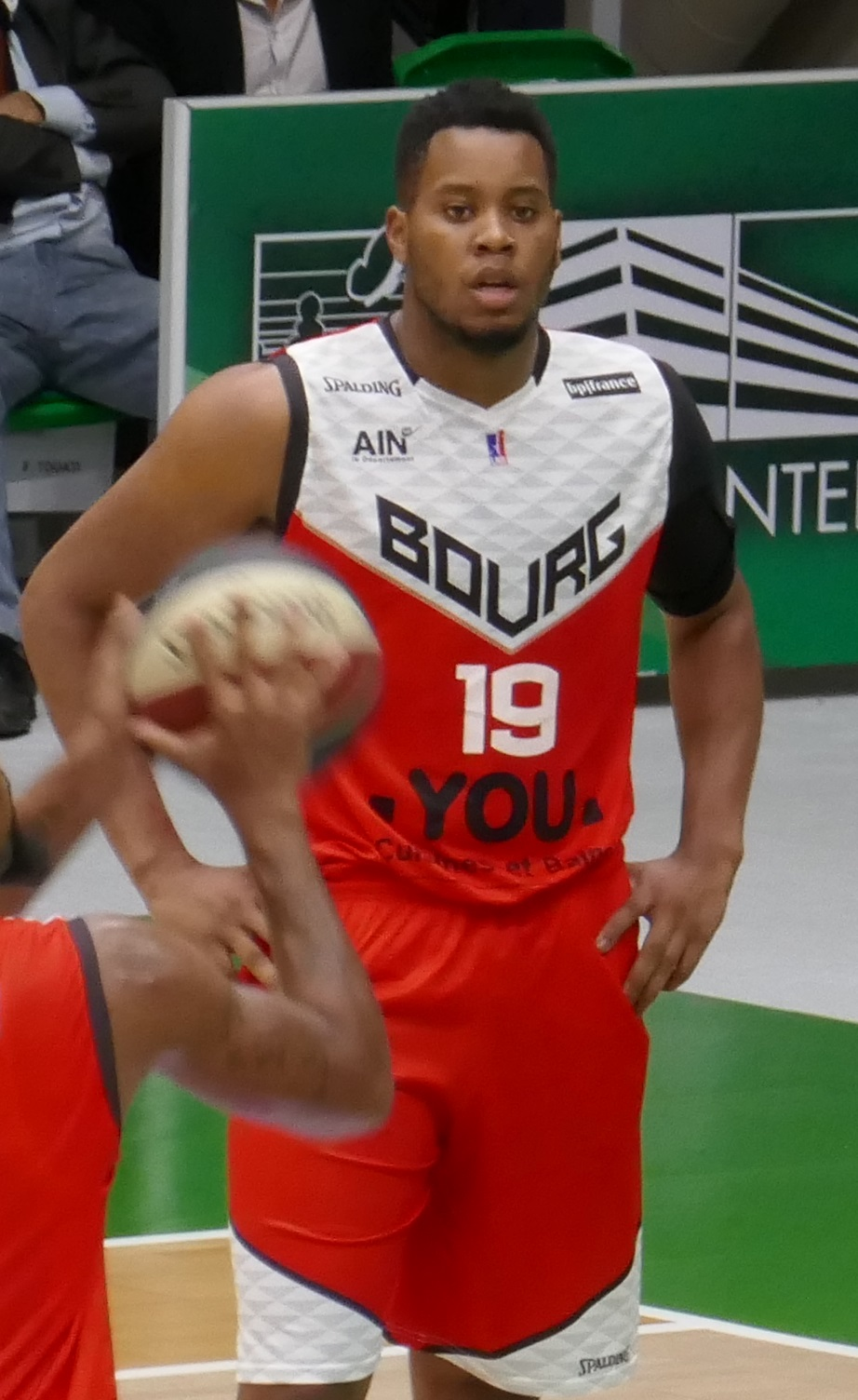

Nantes
- Position: Power forward
- League: LNB Pro B

Personal information
- Born: 13 April 1993 (age 33) Paris, France
- Listed height: 6 ft 7 in (2.01 m)
- Listed weight: 200 lb (91 kg)

Career information
- NBA draft: 2015: undrafted
- Playing career: 2013–present

Career history
- 2013–2014: ADA Blois
- 2014–2015: BC Souffelweyersheim
- 2015–2016: JDA Dijon
- 2016–2017: Orléans
- 2017–2021: JL Bourg
- 2021–2022: Orléans
- 2022–present: Nantes

Kévin Dinal (born 13 April 1993) is a French professional basketball player for Nantes of LNB Pro B.

On 22 June 2014, he signed with Souffelweyersheim. Dinal averaged 10.5 points, 7.7 rebounds and 1.3 assists per game.

On 6 July 2015, Dinal signed with JDA Dijon. He averaged 3.5 points and 2.6 rebounds per game.

On 10 June 2016, he signed with Orléans.

Dinal joined JL Bourg on 21 July 2017. He returned to Orléans on 4 August 2021.
