= Kevin O'Leary (poker player) =

English poker player (born 1969)

- Nickname: Lovejoy
- Born: May 10, 1969 (age 57); Blackfriars, London, England

World Series of Poker
- Bracelet: None

Kevin O'Leary (born May 10, 1969, in Blackfriars, London, UK) is a professional poker player of English descent. A former antiques dealer, he is known on the poker tournament circuit by the nickname "Lovejoy", in reference to the 1980s BBC TV series of the same name, which starred Ian McShane.

== Tournaments ==
O'Leary's poker achievements to date include winning the inaugural GUKPT heads-up championships at London's Grosvenor Victoria Casino, the Caesars Palace Las Vegas "Mega-Stack" championship event in 2008, and making the final table of the televised VC Poker Cup in 2005 at Teddington studios England. He is perhaps best known however, for his prolific tournament record at The Venetian in Las Vegas, where to date he has won a record 5 No-Limit Hold-Em tournaments in the poker room's "Deepstack Extravaganza" series (once in 2007, once in 2008 and three times in 2009), and has also twice won the Venetian's Player of the Series award, again a record in itself. He regularly makes the annual pilgrimage to Las Vegas, where he is a familiar face in Vegas tournaments, including the World Poker Tour, and the World Series of Poker, in which he has also cashed.

O'Leary's biggest single tournament cash to date is $272,000, in the Caesars Palace "Mega-Stack" championship in Las Vegas. He has played most poker variants over the years, but prefers live poker tournaments as opposed to online competitions and cash games, as he feels his edge in live events is much greater, something which appears to be borne out by his record in deepstack freezeout tournaments. A three-year sponsorship deal with UK bookmakers Blue Square ended in 2008 when O'Leary opted to concentrate primarily on live poker rather than play equally live and online.

As of 2015, his live poker tournament cashes exceed $1,000,000.
