= Kevin O'Sullivan (actor) =

American actor

- Born: Kevin O'Sullivan
- Occupation: Actor
- Years active: 1990–present

Kevin O'Sullivan is an American actor. He is best known for his roles in television series Beverly Hills, 90210, Days of Our Lives, and the film The Deal.

== Career ==
Early in his career, O'Sullivan appeared as Lunch Boy in the television series Beverly Hills, 90210 (1990) and later guest-starred on Days of Our Lives. He is mostly known for hIs roles in Cop Land (1997), The Deal (2024), Unveiling Shadow (2025), Tal (2025), Lord Hear Our Prayer (2025), and Choleric (2026). Throughout his career, he has starred in various vertical series. In 2024, he won the Best Supporting Actor award at the Egyptian American Film Festival for his performance as Officer John Nelson in The Deal.

== Filmography ==
Year	Title	Role	Notes
1988	Superior Court	Line-Up Man	TV series
1990	Beverly Hills, 90210	Lunch Boy	TV series
1993	Days of Our Lives	Usher	TV series
1997	Cop Land	Head Pall Bearer / Flag Holder	TV series
2022	The Border	U.S. Marshal	Film
2023	Sketch	Police Officer	TV series
2023	The Plan	Jack	Film
2024	A Heartbeat Away	Nick	TV series
2024	Crush on the Unwanted Princess	Perry	TV series
2024	Falling for a Superstar	Host	TV series
2024	Genius Baby Gets Daddy Back	Dr. Smith	TV series
2024	Nepotism, Baby!	Fireman #1	Short film
2024	Neither Donkey Nor Horse	Russian Soldier	Short film
2024	The Deal	Officer John Nelson	Film
2025	Bite Me, My Mafia Daddy	Middle-Aged Man	TV series
2025	Bound by My Fiances Uncle	Assistant	TV series
2025	Carrying His Triplets, Becoming His Wifey	Abby's Father	TV series
2025	Falling for You	Jason	TV series
2025	G-Love: My Ex Is MVP	Neil	TV series
2025	Gold Digger or Ture Heiress	President	TV series
2025	Grandma Destroyed Her Heir	Mark	TV series
2025	Hinterlander	Ben	Short film
2025	Lion's Dawn	Claude	TV series
2025	My Boss Is My Secret Sperm Donor	George	TV series
2025	My Unexpected Billionaire Husband	Mr. Levine	TV series
2025	Pick Up a Billionaire Husband	Mr. Taylor	TV series
2025	Tal	Officer Scott	Short film
2025	Taming My Billionaire's Ruthless Desire	Lily's Father	TV series
2025	The Hacker Heiress Strikes Back	Victor	TV series
2025	The Mask: Gone Viral	Marshall	Film
2025	Unveiling Shadow	Officer Bill Davis	Film
2025	Yellowstone: King of Montana	Logan Wayne	TV series
2026	Baby Chef Is Not Someone to Mess With	Gordon	TV series
2026	Being Fired? Now I'm Out of Their League!	Mason Brooks	TV series
2026	Bye Ex, I Got My Jackpot Fiancé	Charlie	TV series
2026	I'll Be Better Without You	Scout	TV series
2026	My Quest for Harvard	Arthur George	TV series
2026	Super Rich Daddy, Come Save Boss Mommy!	Asher Lanford	TV series
2026	Swapped Heiress by My Bestie	EMT	TV series
2026	The Legal Queen's Comeback	David Collins	TV series
2026	The Top Heiress Won't Be Your Wife	Secretary	TV series
