= Kevin J. Miyazaki =

Kevin J. Miyazaki is a photographer and artist based in Milwaukee, Wisconsin. He attended Drake University in Des Moines, Iowa, where he earned his bachelor's degree graphic design in 1990.

== Early life and career ==
While in college, Miyazaki was a newspaper photography intern at the Springfield (OH) News-Sun, the Peoria (IL) Journal Star, the Minneapolis Star Tribune, The Kansas City Star and USA Today. After graduation, he began his career as a staff photographer at The Cincinnati Enquirer newspaper in 1990. In 1998, he became the photographer and photo editor at Cincinnati magazine. in 2000, he moved back to his hometown of Milwaukee and became the first staff photographer at Milwaukee Magazine from 2000-2005. Since 2005, he has been a freelance photographer, with assignments for magazines including Architectural Digest, House Beautiful, Midwest Living, Smithsonian, New York Times, Time, Travel + Leisure, HGTV, Food Network and AARP. He editorial photography work is represented by photo agency Redux Pictures. Miyazaki has photographed more than a dozen cookbooks for publishers including Knopf, Workman, Clarkson Potter, Chronicle and Rizzoli.

== Contributions ==
Miyazaki founded collectdotgive, an online charitable photography website in December 2009, which operated for 8 years and closed in 2017. In that time, 1246 prints were sold by 84 photographers, raising $60,772.95 for artist-selected charities.

Miyazaki's artwork explores themes of family history, identity, memory and place. It has been featured in galleries and museums, including Museum of Wisconsin Art, Hyde Park Art Center, Haggerty Museum of Art, Jewish Museum Milwaukee and Madison Museum of Contemporary Art. He has also received several honors for his work, including being a recipient of the Mary L. Nohl Fund Fellowship, and being hosted as an artist in residence at the Center for Photography at Woodstock.
