= Kevin O'Sullivan (hurler) =

Irish hurler

Personal information
- Native name: Caoimhín Ó Súilleabháin (Irish)
- Born: 1974 (age 51–52) Cashel, County Tipperary, Ireland

Sport
- Sport: Hurling
- Position: Goalkeeper
Club
- Years: Club
- Cashel King Cormacs
Club titles
- Tipperary titles: 0
Inter-county
Years	County	Apps (scores)
1996-1997	Tipperary	0 (0-00)
Inter-county titles
- Munster titles: 0
- All-Irelands: 0
- NHL: 0
- All Stars: 0

Kevin O'Sullivan (born 1974) is an Irish hurler who played as a goalkeeper for the Tipperary senior team.

O'Sullivan joined the team during the 1996 championship and was a regular member of the team for just two seasons. An All-Ireland medalist as a non-playing substitute in the under-21 grade, he failed to claim any honours at senior level.

At club level O'Sullivan plays with Cashel King Cormacs club.
