= Kevin Walker =

Kevin Walker may refer to:

== People ==
- Kev Walker (born 1965), British comic book artist
- Kevin Walker (baseball) (born 1976), American professional baseball coach and former pitcher
- Kevin Walker (cornerback) (born 1963), former American football cornerback
- Kevin Walker (linebacker) (born 1965), former American football linebacker
- Kevin Walker (Swedish footballer) (born 1989), Swedish football player and singer, winner of Swedish Idol in 2013
- Kevin Walker (Scottish footballer) (born 1991), Scottish football goalkeeper
- Geordie Walker (Kevin Walker, 1958–2023), English rock musician

== Other ==
- Kevin Walker (Brothers & Sisters), a character on the television show Brothers & Sisters
