= Kevin Sullivan (footballer) =

Australian rules footballer

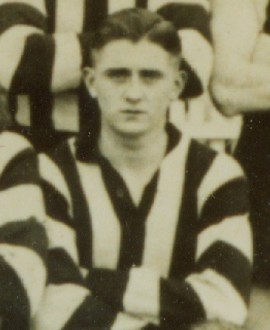
- Sullivan in 1941

Personal information
- Full name: Kevin Barry Sullivan
- Born: 9 September 1922; Melbourne, Victoria
- Died: 24 January 1972 (aged 49)
- Original team: Collingwood Juniors
- Height: 180 cm (5 ft 11 in)
- Weight: 73 kg (161 lb)

Playing career^{1}
| Years | Club | Games (Goals) |
| 1941, 1943, 1946 | Collingwood | 13 (1) |
- ^{1} Playing statistics correct to the end of 1946.

Kevin Barry Sullivan (9 September 1922 – 24 January 1972) was an Australian rules footballer who played with Collingwood in the Victorian Football League (VFL).
