= Kevin Doyle =

Kevin Doyle may refer to:

- Kevin Doyle (footballer) (born 1983), Irish footballer
- Kevin Doyle (actor) (born 1961), English actor
- Kevin Doyle (rugby league), Sydney Roosters player, 1953–54
- Kevin Doyle, a fictional character in the 2008 romantic comedy film 27 Dresses
