= Kevin Johnson =

Kevin Johnson may refer to:

== Entertainment ==
- Kevin Johnson (singer) (born 1942), Australian singer
- Kevin Johnson (ventriloquist) (born 1970), ventriloquist on America's Got Talent
- Kevin Royal Johnson (born 1961), American singer-songwriter and author

=== Fictional characters ===
- The fictional character in the film The Disappearance of Kevin Johnson
- Kevin Johnson (Lost) or Michael Dawson, fictional character from Lost

== Sports ==
=== Gridiron football ===
- Kevin Johnson (cornerback) (born 1992), American football cornerback
- Kevin Johnson (defensive tackle) (1970–2026), American football player
- Kevin Johnson (wide receiver) (born 1976), American football wide receiver
- Kevin Johnson (Canadian football) (born 1973), American football linebacker in the Canadian Football League

=== Other sports ===
- Kevin Johnson (sprinter) (1951–2016), Bahamian sprinter
- Kevin Johnson (basketball player) (born 1966), American former professional basketball player and former mayor of Sacramento, California
- Kevin Johnson (basketball coach) (born 1966), American college basketball coach
- Kevin Johnson (boxer) (born 1979), American heavyweight boxer
- Kevin Johnson (footballer) (born 1952), English former footballer
- Kevin Johnson (golfer) (born 1967), American professional golfer who currently plays on the Nationwide Tour
- Kevin Johnson (runner) (born 1960), co-U.S. champion in the mile at the 1986 USA Indoor Track and Field Championships

== Others ==
- Kevin Johnson (lawyer), professor and former dean, University of California, Davis School of Law (King Hall)
- Kevin Johnson (American businessman) (born 1960), former CEO of Starbucks and previous Microsoft executive
- Kevin Johnson (venture capitalist) (born 1960), British businessman
- Kevin L. Johnson (born 1960), member of the South Carolina Senate
- Kevin Rashid Johnson (born 1971), American convict
- Kevin Johnson Jr. (1985–2022), American man executed in Missouri
- Kevin B. Johnson, American physician and biomedical informatician
