= Kevin McGee =

American politician

Kevin J. McGee is a former Republican member of the Mississippi House of Representatives from Brandon, Mississippi. Elected in 2007 and re-elected in 2011, he resigned on November 19, 2012, due to ethics violations regarding $346,554 in public printing contracts that were directed towards his family's business.
