= Keaveney =

Keaveney is an Irish surname, which is an anglicized form of the Gaelic Ó Géibheannaigh, meaning "descendant of Géibheannach". Géibheannach means "fettered". Alternative spellings include Keaveny, Keveney, Keavney, and Kiveney. Related names include Caveney, Kaney, Kevan, Kevany, Kenney, Kenny, Geaveny, Geany, Guiney, Gainey and O'Guiney.

== Background ==
The O Geibheannaigh sept came from County Galway. A sept or clan was a collective term describing a group of persons whose immediate ancestors bore a common surname and inhabited the same territory. This was a sept of the Uí Mháine (or "Hymany") descended from Geibhennach, son of Aedh, Chief of the Uí Mháine. Geibhennach was slain in battle in 971 at Keshcorran, County Sligo.

The Uí Mháine chieftains ruled much of East Galway and South Roscommon. The Irish language meaning of Géibheannach is "hostage" or "captive" probably indicating that Aedh's son had been taken hostage by enemies at an earlier stage.

== People ==
- Anna Keaveney (1949–2004), British actress
- Arthur Keaveney (1951–2020), Irish historian
- Cecilia Keaveney (born 1968), Irish politician (TD for Donegal North-East 1996–2007, Senator 2007–2011)
- Colm Keaveney (born 1971), Irish politician (TD for Galway East 2011–2016)
- Jimmy Keaveney (born 1945), Irish football player
- Joseph Keaveny (born 1955), American politician
- Paddy Keaveney (1929–1995), Irish politician (TD for Donegal North-East 1976–1977)
- Shaun Keaveny (born 1972), British broadcaster
- Patrick Kavanagh, poet, paternal grandfather was Patrick Kevany from Sligo (1904–1967)
