= Douglas Keely Kevan =

Douglas Keely Kevan FRSE FACCA (1895–1968) was a 20th-century British chartered accountant and noted entomologist and conchologist.

== Life ==
He was born on 4 February 1895 in Chelmsford, Essex, and the son of Alfred Keely Kevan.

He served in the Territorial Army and was immediately called up at the onset of the First World War. He served in the London Scottish Regiment and was promoted to Second Lieutenant in May 1915. He was wounded later in 1915 and transferred to home duties with the Royal Army Service Corps, where he achieved the rank of captain.

In his professional life, he worked variously for Neame & Co and for Price & Price, largely linked to the timber industry. In 1943, he was elected a Fellow of the Royal Society of Edinburgh due to his contributions to science. His proposers were Alexander Charles Stephen, James Ritchie, James Wright and Thomas Rowatt.

He retired in 1958 and died at home, 9 Cluny Drive in Edinburgh on 15 May 1968.

== Family ==
In 1918, he married Gynnyth Paine. They had one son, Prof Douglas Keith McEwan Kevan FRSE.
