= Kevin MacDonald (artist) =

American artist

Kevin John MacDonald
- Born: 2 July 1946; Washington, DC
- Died: 2 June 2006 (aged 59); Rockville, MD
- Known for: large scale drawings; works on paper in all media; lithographic fine art prints; silkscreen fine art prints; oil paintings
- Education: George Washington University BA Art 1969; Corcoran School of Art
- Website: kevinmacdonaldart.com

Kevin John MacDonald (2 July 1946 – 2 June 2006) was a Washington DC–based artist best known for his large scale drawings in color pencil. The artist is also known for oil paintings and fine art prints, especially lithography and silkscreen printing.

== Life and work ==
MacDonald received his BA from George Washington University in 1969 and also studied art at the now closed Corcoran School of Art in Washington DC. In 1992 he taught briefly at the Corcoran and at Montgomery College in Takoma Park MD. MacDonald was a long-time resident of Silver Spring MD.

MacDonald served on the board of directors of the Washington Project for the Arts for six years, including two as board president. He was also a long time contributor to Washington Arts Museum's activities.

MacDonald died of kidney cancer on 2 June 2006. He died at the Casey House (Note: Casey House hospice is located in an unincorporated area of Montgomery county Maryland (northeast of Redland MD, sometimes called Silver Spring); it has a postal address for Rockville MD) hospice facility in Montgomery county Maryland.

== Public collections ==
In addition to his work being owned by various private collections, much of his work is on display in a variety of public museums and galleries. Some of the public venues displaying MacDonald's work include:

- Baltimore Museum of Art
- Corcoran Gallery
- Hirshhorn Museum and Sculpture Garden
- Iowa Museum of Art (Iowa University)
- Library of Congress
- Metropolitan Museum of Art (New York City)
- National Gallery of Art
- Smithsonian American Art Museum
- The Phillips Collection
- Zimmerli Museum, Rutgers University
- City of Washington DC, DC Commission on the Arts and Humanities Art Bank
