= Kevin Kolevar =

Public official

Kevin M. Kolevar is Vice President, Government Affairs, Public Policy and Issues Management at the Dow Chemical Company. He joined Dow Chemical in 2009 after serving as the Assistant Secretary for Electricity Delivery and Energy Reliability in the United States Department of Energy.

Kolevar is a graduate of the University of Michigan. After graduation, he spent over ten years serving as a member of United States Senate staff in the offices of Senators Spencer Abraham and Connie Mack III.

Following the inauguration of President George W. Bush in 2001, Kolevar joined the Department of Energy as a Senior Policy Advisor. From 2003 to 2005, Kolevar served as Chief of Staff to the Deputy Secretary of Energy Kyle McSlarrow. He then led the newly created Office of Electricity Delivery and Energy Reliability and was confirmed as the Assistant Secretary for Electricity Delivery and Energy Reliability in 2007.

In his position with Dow Chemical, Kolevar has been an outspoken supporter of advanced manufacturing policies for the US, workforce equality issues, comprehensive natural gas export policy, and the Export–Import Bank of the United States.

== Department of Energy ==
Following the inauguration of President George W. Bush in 2001, Kolevar joined the Department of Energy as a Senior Policy Advisor. From 2003 to 2005, Kolevar served as chief of staff to the Deputy Secretary of Energy Kyle McSlarrow. While at the department, Kolevar was chair of the Department of Energy National Security Working Group. He also served as an advisor to the U.S.-Canada Task Force investigating the 2003 Northeast blackout. In 2005, he was named director of the newly created Office of Electricity Delivery and Energy Reliability. In August 2007, he was confirmed as the Assistant Secretary for the program.

=== Assistant Secretary of Energy for Electricity Delivery and Energy Reliability ===
Kolevar coordinated energy response efforts with the energy industry and other federal agencies in the wake of national energy emergencies, including Hurricanes Katrina, Rita, and Wilma. His office collected, analyzed, and disseminated vital information to all involved in the response and restoration efforts and served in a coordinating role for the energy sector. As Assistant Secretary, Kolevar also oversaw the research and development portfolio for electric technology grid integration.

== ClearView Energy Partners ==
After leaving the DOE, Kolevar cofounded ClearView Energy Partners LLC. The firm identifies and quantifies non-fundamental energy risks for financial investors and corporate strategists.

== The Dow Chemical Company ==
In late 2009, Kolevar joined Dow Chemical as senior director, international government affairs and public policy. In 2012, he became vice president, government affairs and public policy.

=== Advocacy with Dow ===
Kolevar worked on the Obama administration's Advanced Manufacturing Partnership, a national effort bringing together industry, universities, and the federal government to invest in emerging technologies to create high quality manufacturing jobs and enhance US global competitiveness.

He has spoken on behalf of Dow in support of policies to revitalize U.S. manufacturing and a measured approach to natural gas exports. In 2014, Kolevar described annual exports of 6 billion to 8 billion cubic tons as a "sweet spot" that would preserve domestic supply.

Kolevar has been a longstanding supporter of Congressional reauthorization of the Export–Import Bank of the United States and is an outspoken advocate for workforce equality on behalf of Dow.
