= Kevin Hansen =

Kevin Hansen may refer to:

- Kevin Hansen (footballer) (born 1979), German footballer
- Kevin Hansen (volleyball) (born 1982), American volleyball player
- Kevin Hansen (racing driver) (born 1998), Swedish rallycross driver
- Kevin Hansen (rugby league) (1927–1971), Australian rugby league footballer
