= Kevon Clement =

Trinidad and Tobago footballer

Personal information
- Full name: Kevon Clement
- Date of birth: October 23, 1983 (age 43)
- Place of birth: Trinidad and Tobago
- Height: 6 ft 3 in (1.91 m)
- Position: Midfielder

Team information
- Current team: United Petrotrin
- Number: 29

Senior career*
Years	Team	Apps	(Gls)
2002–2004	W Connection		
2004–	United Petrotrin		

International career
2004–2008	Trinidad U-23	11	(0)
- * Club domestic league appearances and goals

Kevon Clement (born October 23, 1983, in Trinidad) is a Trinidad and Tobago football player, who plays as a midfielder for United Petrotrin (TT Pro League).

== International career ==
He is also current member of the U-23 team from Soca Warriors.
