= Kevin Müller =

Kevin Müller may refer to:

- Kevin Müller (canoeist) (born 1988), German canoer
- Kevin Müller (footballer) (born 1991), German footballer
- Kevin Muller (footballer) (born 1987), Puerto Rican soccer player
