= Kevin McCarthy (disambiguation) =

Kevin McCarthy is an American politician, who served as Speaker of the House in 2023.

Kevin McCarthy may also refer to:

== Entertainment ==
- Kevin McCarthy (actor) (1914–2010), film actor
- Kevin McCarthy (director), American television director
- Kevin McCarthy (radio), Texas radio personality

== Politicians ==
- Kevin McCarthy (Iowa politician) (born 1971), Democratic member of the Iowa House of Representatives
- Kevin A. McCarthy (born 1950), Democratic member of the Illinois House of Representatives

== Sports ==
- Kevin McCarthy (baseball) (born 1992), American baseball player
- Kevin McCarthy (cricketer) (born 1945), Australian cricketer
- Kevin McCarthy (ice hockey) (born 1957), Canadian ice hockey player and assistant coach

== Others ==
- Kevin McCarthy (historian), American historian
- Kevin "Blondie" McCarthy, member of the Aryan Republican Army, who robbed 22 U.S. banks

== See also ==
- Kevin MacArthur, fictional character on television series The League
- Kevin McCarty (born 1972), Democratic mayor of Sacramento
- McCarthy (surname)
