= Kevin Newman =

Kevin Newman may refer to:

- Kevin Newman (baseball) (born 1994), American baseball player
- Kevin Newman (journalist) (born 1959), Canadian journalist and news anchor
- Kevin Newman (politician) (1933–1999), Australian soldier and politician
