= Kevan Tebay =

English cricketer (1936–1996)

- Tebay in 1963

Personal information
- Born: 2 February 1936; Bolton, Lancashire, England
- Died: 13 August 1996 (aged 60); Bolton, Lancashire, England
- Batting: Right-handed
- Role: Batsman

Domestic team information
- Years: Team
- 1961 to 1963: Lancashire

Career statistics
Competition	FC
Matches	15
Runs scored	509
Batting average	20.36
100s/50s	1/2
Top score	106
Catches/stumpings	3/0
- Source: Cricinfo, 25 August 2025

Kevan Tebay (2 February 1936 – 13 August 1996) was an English cricketer who played first-class cricket for Lancashire from 1961 to 1963.

A right-handed batsman, Tebay played 15 first-class matches for Lancashire, scoring 509 runs with a highest score of 106 against Hampshire in 1962. He was highly successful in the Bolton League, mostly for the Astley Bridge and Egerton clubs.

Tebay was born in Bolton and died there in 1996, aged 60.
