= Kevin Lynch =

Kevin Lynch may refer to:

- Kevin Lynch (American football), College football coach and former player
- Kevin Lynch (basketball) (born 1968), Minnesota basketball player
- Kevin Lynch (computing), VP at Apple, former CTO of Adobe Systems
- Kevin Lynch, English football referee; see list of FIFA international referees
- Kevin Lynch (hunger striker) (1956–1981), Irish republican
- Kevin Lynch (ice hockey) (born 1991), American ice hockey player
- Kevin Lynch (judge) (1927–2013), Irish Supreme Court judge
- Kevin A. Lynch (1918–1984), American urban planner
  - Kevin Lynch Award, named in his honor
- Kevin G. Lynch (born 1951), Canadian civil servant
- Kevin Lynch, a fictional Criminal Minds character
