= Kevin Rader =

Kevin Rader may refer to:

- Kevin Rader (politician) (born 1968), American politician
- Kevin Rader (American football) (born 1995), American football tight end
