= Kevin Richardson =

Kevin Richardson may refer to:

- Kevin Richardson (American football) (born 1986), American football player
- Kevin Richardson (baseball) (born 1980), American baseball player
- Kevin Richardson (footballer) (born 1962), English footballer
- Kevin Michael Richardson (born 1964), American film, television and actor
- Kevin Richardson (musician) (born 1971), American musician and member of the Backstreet Boys
- Kevin Richardson (zookeeper) (born 1974), South African lion keeper
- Mo Heart, real name Kevin Richardson (born 1986), American drag queen
