= Kevin Parker (Australian footballer, born 1945) =

Australian rules footballer

Personal information
- Born: 8 May 1945 (age 81)
- Original team: Springvale
- Height: 189 cm (6 ft 2 in)
- Weight: 83 kg (183 lb)

Playing career^{1}
Years	Club	Games (Goals)
1966	Fitzroy	2 (0)
- ^{1} Playing statistics correct to the end of 1966.

Kevin Parker (born 8 May 1945) is a former Australian rules footballer who played with Fitzroy in the Victorian Football League (VFL).
