= Kevin Hays (speedcuber) =

American speedcuber (born 1994)

- Hays at the Rubik's Cube World Championship in July 2015
- Born: May 12, 1994 (age 31)
- Known for: Rubik's Cube speedsolving
Medal record
Representing United States
Speedcubing
Event	1st	2nd	3rd
World Championship	6	4	0
North American Championship	1	0	1
US National Championship	21	13	4
Total	28	17	5
World Championship
Event	1st	2nd	3rd
5x5x5	1	1	0
6x6x6	3	1	0
7x7x7	2	2	0
Total	6	4	0
Gold medal – first place	2013 Las Vegas	5x5x5
Gold medal – first place	2013 Las Vegas	6x6x6
Gold medal – first place	2013 Las Vegas	7x7x7
Gold medal – first place	2015 São Paulo	6x6x6
Gold medal – first place	2015 São Paulo	7x7x7
Gold medal – first place	2017 Paris	6x6x6
Silver medal – second place	2011 Bangkok	7x7x7
Silver medal – second place	2015 São Paulo	5x5x5
Silver medal – second place	2017 Paris	7x7x7
Silver medal – second place	2019 Melbourne	6x6x6
North American Championship
Event	1st	2nd	3rd
6x6x6	0	0	1
7x7x7	1	0	0
Total	1	0	1
Gold medal – first place	2022 Toronto	7x7
Bronze medal – third place	2022 Toronto	6x6
US National Championship
Event	1st	2nd	3rd
3x3x3	0	1	1
4x4x4	1	3	1
5x5x5	5	4	1
6x6x6	7	4	0
7x7x7	7	2	2
Magic	1	0	0
Total	21	13	4
Gold medal – first place	2009 Stanford, CA	Magic
Gold medal – first place	2010 Cambridge, MA	6x6x6
Gold medal – first place	2011 Columbus, OH	7x7x7
Gold medal – first place	2012 Las Vegas, NV	4x4x4
Gold medal – first place	2012 Las Vegas, NV	5x5x5
Gold medal – first place	2012 Las Vegas, NV	6x6x6
Gold medal – first place	2012 Las Vegas, NV	7x7x7
Gold medal – first place	2013 Las Vegas, NV	5x5x5
Gold medal – first place	2013 Las Vegas, NV	6x6x6
Gold medal – first place	2013 Las Vegas, NV	7x7x7
Gold medal – first place	2014 Jersey City, NJ	5x5x5
Gold medal – first place	2014 Jersey City, NJ	6x6x6
Gold medal – first place	2014 Jersey City, NJ	7x7x7
Gold medal – first place	2015 Hilton Head, SC	5x5x5
Gold medal – first place	2015 Hilton Head, SC	6x6x6
Gold medal – first place	2015 Hilton Head, SC	7x7x7
Gold medal – first place	2016 Portland, OR	5x5x5
Gold medal – first place	2016 Portland, OR	6x6x6
Gold medal – first place	2016 Portland, OR	7x7x7
Gold medal – first place	2017 Fort Wayne, IN	6x6x6
Gold medal – first place	2017 Fort Wayne, IN	7x7x7
Silver medal – second place	2010 Cambridge, MA	5x5x5
Silver medal – second place	2011 Columbus, OH	3x3x3
Silver medal – second place	2011 Columbus, OH	4x4x4
Silver medal – second place	2011 Columbus, OH	5x5x5
Silver medal – second place	2011 Columbus, OH	6x6x6
Silver medal – second place	2014 Jersey City, NJ	4x4x4
Silver medal – second place	2015 Hilton Head, SC	4x4x4
Silver medal – second place	2017 Fort Wayne, IN	5x5x5
Silver medal – second place	2018 Salt Lake City, UT	5x5x5
Silver medal – second place	2018 Salt Lake City, UT	6x6x6
Silver medal – second place	2018 Salt Lake City, UT	7x7x7
Silver medal – second place	2019 Baltimore, MD	6x6x6
Silver medal – second place	2019 Baltimore, MD	7x7x7
Silver medal – second place	2023 Pittsburgh, PA	6x6x6
Bronze medal – third place	2010 Cambridge, MA	7x7x7
Bronze medal – third place	2012 Las Vegas, NV	3x3x3
Bronze medal – third place	2013 Las Vegas, NV	4x4x4
Bronze medal – third place	2019 Baltimore, MD	5x5x5
Bronze medal – third place	2023 Pittsburgh, PA	7x7x7

Kevin Hays (born May 12, 1994) is an American speedcuber. He is best known for his proficiency at solving larger Rubik's cube puzzles, specifically the 5×5×5, 6×6×6 and 7×7×7 events. He has won six World Championship titles and set 21 world records across the aforementioned three events. In addition, he has set 47 North American records and secured 21 titles at the United States National Championships.

== Personal life ==
Hays was raised in Renton, Washington, where he started speedcubing during his freshman year of high school in January 2009. He later enrolled at Washington University in St. Louis, where he continued to practice cubing while also competing as a member of the Washington University Bears varsity swim team.

In 2019, Hays competed on the American television game show series Mental Samurai, ultimately finishing in 5th place.

== Rubik's Cube career ==
Hays made his competition debut at US Nationals 2009, achieving a 4th place finish in the 6×6×6 event and advancing to the final round in the 5×5×5 event. The following year at US Nationals 2010, he secured the national title in the 6×6 category with an average time of 2:36.44. At US Nationals 2011, he set his first world records in the 6×6×6 event, recording a world-record single time of 2:02.31 and an average time of 2:09.03.

In October 2011, Hays participated in his first World Championship in Bangkok, Thailand. Although he still held the world record average in the 6×6 event at this point, he recorded a DNF (Did Not Finish) result in the finals. However, he achieved a 2nd place finish in the 7×7×7 event with an average time of 3:46.99. At the 2012 US Nationals, he won the 4×4×4, 5×5×5, 6×6×6, and 7×7×7 events while finishing third in the traditional 3×3×3 event. Between 2012 and 2016, Hays consistently claimed the US national champion title in the 5×5×5, 6×6×6, and 7×7×7 events and maintained a top-three placement in these events for ten consecutive US Nationals from 2010 to 2019.

At the 2013 World Championship in Las Vegas, Nevada, Hays became the first competitor to win the 5×5×5, 6×6×6, and 7×7×7 events at a single championship. At the 2015 World Championship in São Paulo, Brazil, he defended his titles in the 6×6×6 and 7×7×7 events and finished second in the 5×5×5 event behind Feliks Zemdegs. During the 2017 World Championship in Paris, France, Hays once again defended his 6×6×6 title and placed as runner-up in the 7×7×7 event behind Feliks Zemdegs. In 2019, at the World Championship in Melbourne, Australia, he finished second in the 6×6×6 event, with Max Park emerging as the champion.

Throughout his career, Hays broke the 6×6×6 world record single time on six occasions and improved the average record nine times. From December 10, 2011, to December 17, 2016, he was the sole record holder of the 6×6 single event, improving his record from 1:54.81 to 1:32.77. On March 10, 2018, Hays set a milestone by becoming the first person to solve a 7×7×7 cube in under two minutes in an official competition, with a time of 1:59.95.

On August 10, 2019, Hays announced his retirement from elite speedcubing to focus on the hobby aspect of the sport, and he later confirmed his retirement from professional speedcubing on January 1, 2022.

== Notable results ==
=== World records ===
Event	Single	Average	Competition	Date	Times
6×6×6		1:34.21	Lexington Summer 2017	July 1, 2017	1:40.66, 1:32.77, 1:29.19
6×6×6	1:32.77	1:42.36	Asian Championship 2016	October 1, 2016	1:45.93, 1:48.39, 1:32.77
6×6×6		1:45.98	World Championship 2015	June 14, 2015	1:43.03, 1:51.66, 1:43.23
6×6×6		1:46.41	World Championship 2015	July 17, 2015	1:48.99, 1:48.66, 1:41.58
6×6×6	1:33.55		Indiana 2015	June 12, 2015	
6×6×6	1:40.86	1:51.30	Vancouver Summer 2013	August 3, 2013	1:40.86, 2:01.94, 1:51.11
6×6×6	1:49.46	1:55.13	Couve Cubing 2012	May 5, 2012	1:53.88, 2:02.06, 1:49.46
6×6×6		2:00.43	Lynden Open 2012	February 4, 2012	1:57.96, 2:02.38, 2:00.94
6×6×6	1:54.81	2:02.13	Vancouver Winter 2011	December 10, 2011	2:00.93, 1:54.81, 2:10.66
6×6×6	2:02.31	2:09.03	US Nationals 2009	August 12, 2011	2:13.68, 2:11.09, 2:02.31
7×7×7	1:57.76		Rose City 2018	June 9, 2018	
7×7×7	1:59.95	2:08.71	CubingUSA Heartland Championship 2018	March 10, 2018	2:13.91, 2:12.27, 1:59.95
7×7×7		2:15.07	Puget Sound Fall 2017	September 23, 2017	2:23.33, 2:07.77, 2:14.12
7×7×7		2:42.85	Clock N' Stuff 2015	May 23, 2015	2:45.87, 2:37.56, 2:45.11
7×7×7		2:54.77	World Championship 2013	July 28, 2013	2:42.80, 2:56.39, 3:05.31

=== World Championship podiums ===
Year	Event	Place	Single	Average	Times
2019	6×6×6	2	1:18.42	1:27.02	1:18.42, 1:30.94, 1:31.69
2017	6×6×6	1	1:32.00	1:35.34	1:32.00, 1:36.27, 1:37.75
2017	7×7×7	2	2:21.55	2:25.83	2:28.18, 2:21.55, 2:27.76
2015	5×5×5	2	51.26	55.66	51.26, 57.76, 54.77, 54.45, 1:02.12
2015	6×6×6	1	1:43.04	1:45.98	1:43.04, 1:51.66, 1:43.23
2015	7×7×7	1	2:41.89	2:45.36	2:45.36, 2:41.89, 2:50.43
2013	5×5×5	1	1:00.53	1:01.81	1:01.43, 1:01.64, 1:10.17, 1:00.53, 1:02.35
2013	6×6×6	1	1:52.42	1:56.14	1:52.92, 2:03.09, 1:52.42
2013	7×7×7	1	2:42.80	2:54.77	2:42.80, 2:56.39, 3:05.13
2011	7×7×7	2	3:37.52	3:46.99	3:37.52, 3:51.19, 3:52.27

=== Official personal bests ===
Event	Category	Time	Competition name
3×3×3	Single	5.89	PDX Cubing for Dougy 2016
3×3×3	Average	7.68	WCA World Championship 2019
4×4×4	Single	21.73	CubingUSA Nationals 2018
4×4×4	Average	27.10	Seattle Cube Cascade UW 2025
5×5×5	Single	40.68	Cube Against Cancer Boston 2026
5×5×5	Average	47.11	Kirkland Pyra Fest 2024
6×6×6	Single	1:12.97	Surrey Side Events 2026
6×6×6	Average	1:19.38	Lakewood Spring 2026
7×7×7	Single	1:49.62	West Coast Cubing Western Championship 2025
7×7×7	Average	1:56.03	Empire State Winter 2024
