= KVAN =

KVAN is the call sign of:

- KVAN (AM), a radio station (1560 AM) licensed to serve Burbank, Washington, United States
- KVAN-LP, a radio station (91.7 FM) licensed to serve Tucson, Arizona, United States
- KUMA-FM, a radio station (92.1 FM) licensed to serve Pilot Rock, Oregon, United States, which held the call sign KVAN-FM from 2007 to 2010
