= Kevin Long =

Kevin Long may refer to:

- Kevin Long (skateboarder) (born 1984), American professional skateboarder
- Kevin Long (offensive lineman) (born 1975), American footballer
- Kevin Long (running back) (1955–2024), former football player with the USFL Chicago Blitz (and later the NFL)
- Kevin Long (baseball) (born 1966), American baseball coach
- Kevin Long (artist), American artist known for his work with Palladium Books
- Kevin Long (footballer) (born 1990), Irish footballer
