= Keyvan =

Keyvan may refer to:

- Keyvan, Iran, a village
- Keyvan Rural District, in Iran
- Kayvan, a given name
