= Kevinismus =

German prejudice against children with unusual names

Kevinismus ("Kevinism") is a German term for the practice of giving children trendy, exotic-sounding names as opposed to traditional German ones. It is often considered to be an indicator of low social class. The prototypical example is Kevin, which like most such names came to Germany from Anglo-American culture. Specifically, Kevin McCallister, the protagonist of the 1990 comedy film Home Alone (titled Kevin – Allein zu Haus in the German release) is credited with making Kevin the most popular boys' name chosen in Germany in 1991. Kevin Costner's 1990 film Dances with Wolves is often cited as an additional factor. Both films were released in Germany in 1991 and were the two most successful films there in that year. However, the name had already been introduced to Germany and achieved brief popularity in the late 1970s, during English footballer Kevin Keegan's spell with Hamburger SV.

Sometimes Chantalismus ("Chantalism") is used as a female equivalent, from the French name Chantal.

== Overview ==
The issue of whether parents of lower socioeconomic status have a greater tendency to give their children Anglo-American or other exotic names has been discussed by German sociologists from various points of view, and there is no consensus among them. Because of the unusual and sudden popularity of the name, the term Kevinism (or Chantalism after the female given name Chantal) for this cliché was first created by the satirical website Uncyclopedia, and was subsequently picked up by journalists.

According to a master's thesis presented at the University of Oldenburg in 2009, certain given names of students can lead to prejudice on the part of teachers. For example, the name "Kevin" (an anglicised name of Irish origin), given to a German child, indicates to German teachers that such a student is prone to attention-seeking behaviour, as well as lower scholastic performance, and is also indicative of a lower socioeconomic status. It was not possible to determine whether this also causes a student to be treated less well. Prejudice of this type is understood to be more prevalent among teachers in Western Germany. English or otherwise exotic given names are often understood and stigmatised in the old states of Germany as being typically "Ossi". English given names in East Germany were particularly popular in the 20 years preceding German reunification. There, this trend was also popular among the middle class, while the preference for such given names today, particularly in Western Germany, is perceived as a lower-class phenomenon.

The word "Alpha-Kevin" (combination of Alpha male and the given name), as being representative of a particularly unintelligent young person, was, for a time, at the top of the list, which was the subject of a 2015 online poll for the German Word of the Year and, particularly, the youth word of the year. However, it was struck from the list of suggestions on account of being discriminatory towards people bearing the name Kevin. The phenomenon in Germany, especially during limited periods of time, that particularly popular given names are associated with negative prejudices to the point of being used as swearwords, is not new from a linguistic perspective. In the past, this was the case, as an example, for given names including Horst, Detlef, Uschi (German short form of Ursula) and Heini (German short form of Heinrich).

At a conference on the topic of "given names as social markers" in September 2015 the onomatologist and linguist Damaris Nübling spoke about a "smear campaign" having been waged in Germany against given names such as Kevin and Chantal, and criticised the rhetoric concerning such given names as being "very cheap polemic".
