= Kevin Harris =

Kevin Harris may refer to:

- Kevin Harris (American football) (born 2000), American football running back
- Kevin Harris (politician), (born 1981) member of the Maryland House of Delegates
- Kevin Harris (Ruby Ridge), participant in the 1992 siege in Idaho
- Kevin Harris, character in The Haunting of Hill House (TV series)
- Kevin Harris, a quarterfinalist on the twelfth season of American Idol
- Kevin Harris, brother of Columbine perpetrator Eric Harris

== See also ==
- Kevon Harris, American basketball player
- Calvin Harris (born 1984), Scottish DJ
