= Kevin White (cricketer) =

New Zealand cricketer (born 1958)

Personal information
- Born: 2 June 1958 (age 68); Dannevirke, New Zealand
- Source: Cricinfo, 29 October 2020

Kevin White (born 2 June 1958) is a New Zealand cricketer. He played in two first-class matches, one for Central Districts and one for Northern Districts, in 1978/79 and 1979/80.
