= Kevin F. F. Quigley =

Kevin Francis Flaherty Quigley is an American higher education leader and a non-profit executive who served as the ninth president of Marlboro College in Vermont, from 2015 until its closure in 2020, when it merged into Emerson College in Boston. As part of that process, the Marlboro Institute for Liberal Arts and Interdisciplinary Studies at Emerson was established. He was the President/CEO of the National Peace Corps Association and Peace Corps country director for Thailand. Before serving in higher education and the Peace Corps, Quigley was the first executive of the Global Alliance for Workers and Communities, a pioneering global trisectoral partnership working to improve workplace conditions, and Director of Public Poritable the Pew Charitable Trusts, supporting the transition to more open economies and societies in the former Soviet bloc.

== Books ==
- The Peace Corps Volunteer's Handbook (foreword, written by Travis Hellstrom, Hatherleigh, 2016)
- To See the World as Others See It (Thailand-United States Educational Foundation, 2014)
- For Democracy's Sake: Foundations and Democracy Assistance in Central Europe (Woodrow Wilson Center Press, 1997)
- The Allies and East-West Economic Relations: Past Conflicts and Present Choices (co-editor with Henry R. Nau, Carnegie Council on Ethics and International Affairs 1989)
