= Kévin Diaz (footballer, born 1983) =

French footballer

Personal information
- Date of birth: 11 April 1983 (age 43)
- Place of birth: Saint-Maur-des-Fossés, France
- Height: 1.82 m (6 ft 0 in)
- Position: Striker

Senior career*
Years	Team	Apps	(Gls)
2002–2005	Lusitanos Saint-Maur		
2005–2006	Ivry		
2006–2007	RBC Roosendaal	25	(1)
2007–2009	FC Eindhoven	73	(14)
2009–2011	Cambuur	61	(10)
2011–2013	Fortuna Sittard	56	(7)
2013–2019	Lusitanos Saint-Maur	94+	(28+)
- * Club domestic league appearances and goals

Kévin Diaz (born 11 April 1983) is a French former professional footballer who played as a striker.

== Career ==
Diaz formerly played amateur football in France for Lusitanos Saint-Maur and Ivry, and has also played professionally in the Netherlands for RBC Roosendaal, FC Eindhoven and Cambuur. He signed for Fortuna Sittard in June 2011. He returned to Lusitanos Saint-Maur in 2013.

== Personal life ==
Born in France, Diaz is of Portuguese descent.
