= Kevin Brockman =

American businessman

- Education: University of Florida
- Title: Executive Vice President of Global Communications

Kevin Brockman is an American businessman and former Executive Vice President of Global Communications at The Walt Disney Company. He later served in the same role at WarnerMedia Entertainment and Direct-to-Consumer, where he helped launch the HBO Max streaming service.

== Early life and career ==
Brockman studied organizational behavior at the University of Florida.

After graduating, Brockman moved to New York City and began in theatrical publicity on Broadway and Off Broadway, then served as Manager of Public Relations for Radio City Music Hall before moving to Los Angeles.

In 1993, Brockman became Director of Public Relations, Marketing and On-Air Promo for Fox Television Stations, before helping launch UPN as Head of Corporate and Entertainment Communications in 1995.

Then in 1997, Brockman joined Walt Disney Television as Vice President of Media Relations. He continued to serve in a variety of senior roles and in 2008 was elevated to Executive Vice President of Global Communications, reporting to Zenia Mucha and Anne Sweeney.

In May 2019, it was announced that Brockman would transition to WarnerMedia following Disney's acquisition of Twenty-First Century Fox, after 22 years with the company.

In September 2020, Brockman opted to depart from WarnerMedia after successfully launching HBO Max, saying, "Having had the good fortune over the years to help launch a broadcast network, cable channels and a streaming service, I feel I’ve covered the trifecta in our industry."

== Philanthropy ==
Since 2017, Brockman has served on the Board of Directors for Second Stage Theater.

Previously, he was the Chairman of the Board for GLSEN, an LGBTQ non-profit.

== Personal life ==
He is married to writer and producer Dan Berendsen.
