= Kévin Lacroix (footballer) =

French footballer (born 1984)

Personal information
- Full name: Kévin Lacroix
- Date of birth: 13 October 1984 (age 42)
- Place of birth: Paris, France
- Height: 1.91 m (6 ft 3 in)
- Position: Centre back

Team information
- Current team: Racing FC

Senior career*
Years	Team	Apps	(Gls)
2002–2007	Brive	43	(0)
2007–2010	Eintracht Trier	80	(5)
2010–2014	Swift Hesperange	70	(2)
2014–	Racing FC	25	(1)
2017	→ Fola Esch (loan)	2	(0)

International career
2010–	Guadeloupe	20	(0)
- * Club domestic league appearances and goals as of 5 March 2017 (UTC)

Kévin Lacroix (born 13 October 1984 in Paris) is a French football player of Guadeloupean descent who plays as a central defender for Racing FC Union Luxembourg.

Lacroix spent five seasons with amateur French club ESA Brive who were playing in the Championnat de France amateur, the fourth division of French football. In 2007, he joined German club Eintracht Trier in the Regionalliga West. He left the club in 2010.

In May 2010, Lacroix was reported to have signed a contract with another German club Sportfreunde Lotte. In July 2010, he went on trial with English club Yeovil Town and appeared in a friendly match against Swansea City with the team, but was ultimately not signed. Lacroix is also a Guadeloupean international and made his debut in 2010 playing in the qualifying matches for the 2010 Caribbean Championship.
