= Caoimhe =

Caoimhe (/ˈk(w)iːvə/ K(W)EE-və, Irish: [ˈkiːvʲə]), sometimes anglicised as Keeva, is an Irish feminine given name derived from Irish caomh (Old Irish cóem) 'dear; precious, beloved; belonging to the family'. It is derived from the same root as the masculine name Caoimhín (Kevin). It has been well-used in English-speaking countries and particularly in Ireland. As of 2014, it was ranked 19th most popular name among female births in Ireland.

Notable people with the name include:

- Caoimhe Archibald (born 1981), Irish politician
- Caoimhe Barry, Irish musician
- Caoimhe Bray (born 2009), Australian cricketer
- Caoimhe Butterly (born 1977 or 1978), Irish human rights activist
- Caoimhe Guilfoyle, contestant in the 2010 series of Big Brother UK
- Caoimhe Mitchell (born 2009), Wrestler, Team Illinois, 2x Conference Champion
- Caoimhe Perdue (born 2000), Irish hockey player
- Keeva Fennelly (born 1987), Irish camogie player
- Keeva Keenan (born 1997), Irish footballer

== See also ==
- List of Irish-language given names
