= Kelvin (disambiguation) =

kelvin (symbol: K) is the SI base unit of temperature.

Kelvin may also refer to:

== People ==
- William Thomson, 1st Baron Kelvin, physicist, namesake of kelvin, unit of temperature
- Robert Smith, Baron Smith of Kelvin, former Governor of the BBC
- Kelvin (surname)
- Kelvin (given name), a list of people with the name
- Kelvin (footballer, born 1993), Kelvin Mateus de Oliveira, Brazilian football winger
- Kelvin (footballer, born 1997), Kelvin Giacobe Alves dos Santos, Brazilian football forward
- Kelvin Datcher, American politician
- Kelvin Krash, British hip-hop music producer

== Places ==
=== Scotland, UK ===
- Glasgow Kelvin (Scottish Parliament constituency)
- Glasgow Kelvin (UK Parliament constituency)
- Kelvin Aqueduct, Glasgow
- Kelvin Hall, Glasgow
- Kelvin, South Lanarkshire, an industrial district
- River Kelvin, Glasgow

=== United States ===
- Kelvin, North Dakota, an unincorporated community
- Kelvin (Pittsboro, North Carolina), a NRHP-listed house
- Kelvin Formation, Utah

=== Moon ===
- Rupes Kelvin
- Promontorium Kelvin
- Kelvin Rotslana

=== Other ===
- Kelvin Peninsula, New Zealand
- Kelvin Seamount, a guyot in the Atlantic Ocean
- Kelvin Island (Lake Nipigon), Canada
- Kelvin, Bringelly, Australia

== Companies ==
- Kelvin Central Buses, Scottish transport company
- Kelvin Diesels, Scottish manufacturer of marine diesel engines
- Kelvin Hughes, Scottish marine systems company
- Kelvin Scottish, Scottish transport company

== Vessels ==
- HMS Kelvin (F37), a ship
- SS Lord Kelvin, a cable ship
- USS Kelvin, a fictional starship in the movie Star Trek (2009)

== Other uses ==
- Kelvin, a unit of measure for color temperature
- Cyclone Kelvin, a cyclone in 2018 that hit Australia.
- Kelvin High School, in Winnipeg, Manitoba
- Kelvin (microarchitecture), NVIDIA GPU
- Kelvin Old Boys F.C., a football club in Northern Ireland

== See also ==
- Kelvin Grove (disambiguation)
- List of things named after Lord Kelvin
- Kelvyn (disambiguation)
