= List of things named after Lord Kelvin =

William Thomson, 1st Baron Kelvin was a prolific scientific scholar who gave his name to several things.

== Science and engineering ==
- The SI unit of temperature, kelvin
- Kelvin, a unit of measure for color temperature
- Kelvin balance
- Joule–Thomson effect
  - Joule–Thomson (Kelvin) coefficient
- Kelvin's circulation theorem
- Kelvin–Helmholtz instability
- Kelvin–Helmholtz mechanism
  - Kelvin–Helmholtz luminosity
- Kelvin-Helmholtz time scale
- Kelvin–Planck statement of the 2nd law of thermodynamics
- Kelvin–Varley divider
- Kelvin's balls
- Kelvin bridge
- Kelvin effect, see either Thomson effect or Kelvin equation
- Kelvin equation
- Kelvin–Voigt material, also:
  - Kelvin material
  - Kelvin solid
- Kelvin notation
- Kelvin probe force microscope
- Kelvin sensing
- Kelvin water dropper
- Kelvin wave
- Thomson bridge, see Kelvin bridge
- Thomson effect, Thomson–Seebeck effect: see Thermoelectric effect
- Kelvin Gold Medal, British engineering prize named after Lord Kelvin
- Kelvin Medal and Prize, British physics prize named after Lord Kelvin
- Kelvin cat's eye pattern
- Kelvin wake pattern
- Kelvin angle
- Kelvin’s heat death paradox
- Zero Kelvin
- Kelvin–Stokes theorem
- Kelvin functions
- Kelvin problem/Kelvin conjecture/Kelvin structure/Kelvin foam
- Kelvin transform
- Kelvin (microarchitecture)

== Places ==
- Kelvin, North Dakota
- Rupes Kelvin
- Promontorium Kelvin
- Kelvin Island (Lake Nipigon)

== Other ==
- The Kelvin Building in the University of Glasgow
- SS Lord Kelvin, a cable ship
- Kelvin High School, public high school in Winnipeg, Manitoba, Canada
- 8003 Kelvin, a minor planet
- The Kelvin Club, Melbourne, Australia
- The Kelvin Platform, a data platform for the development of medical AI produced by the UK company Machine Medicine Technologies Ltd.

== See also ==
- Kelvin (disambiguation)
