= Puiseux =

Puiseux may refer to

Geography

- Puiseux, Ardennes, a French commune in the Ardennes department
- Puiseux, Eure-et-Loir, a French commune in the Eure-et-Loir department

Science

- Puiseux crater, a crater on the Moon
- Puiseux series, a mathematical series
- Pierre Puiseux, a 19th-century French astronomer
- Victor Puiseux, a 19th-century French mathematician

== See also ==
- Puiseaux
