= Doppelmayr =

Doppelmayr or Doppelmayer may refer to:

== Aerial lift manufacturers ==
- Doppelmayr Garaventa Group
  - Doppelmayr USA, a subsidiary of the above

== Astronomy ==
- Johann Gabriel Doppelmayr (1677–1750), German mathematician, astronomer and cartographer
- 12622 Doppelmayr, a main-belt asteroid
- Doppelmayer (crater), a lunar crater
