= Agatharchides (crater) =

Lunar impact crater

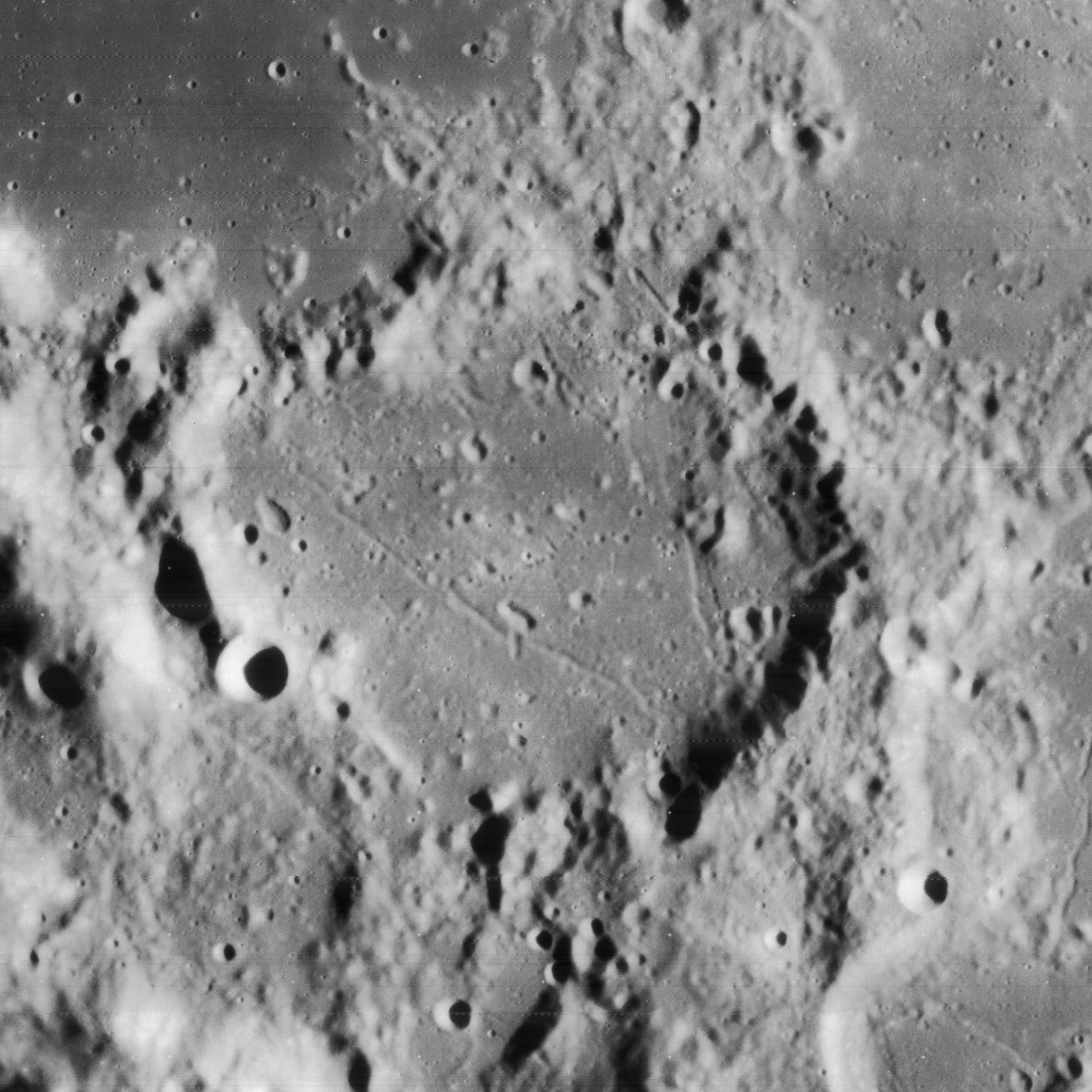
- Lunar Orbiter 4 image
- Coordinates: 19.8°S 30.9°W
- Diameter: 51.98 km (32.30 mi)
- Depth: 1.2 km (0.75 mi)
- Colongitude: 31° at sunrise
- Eponym: Agatharchides

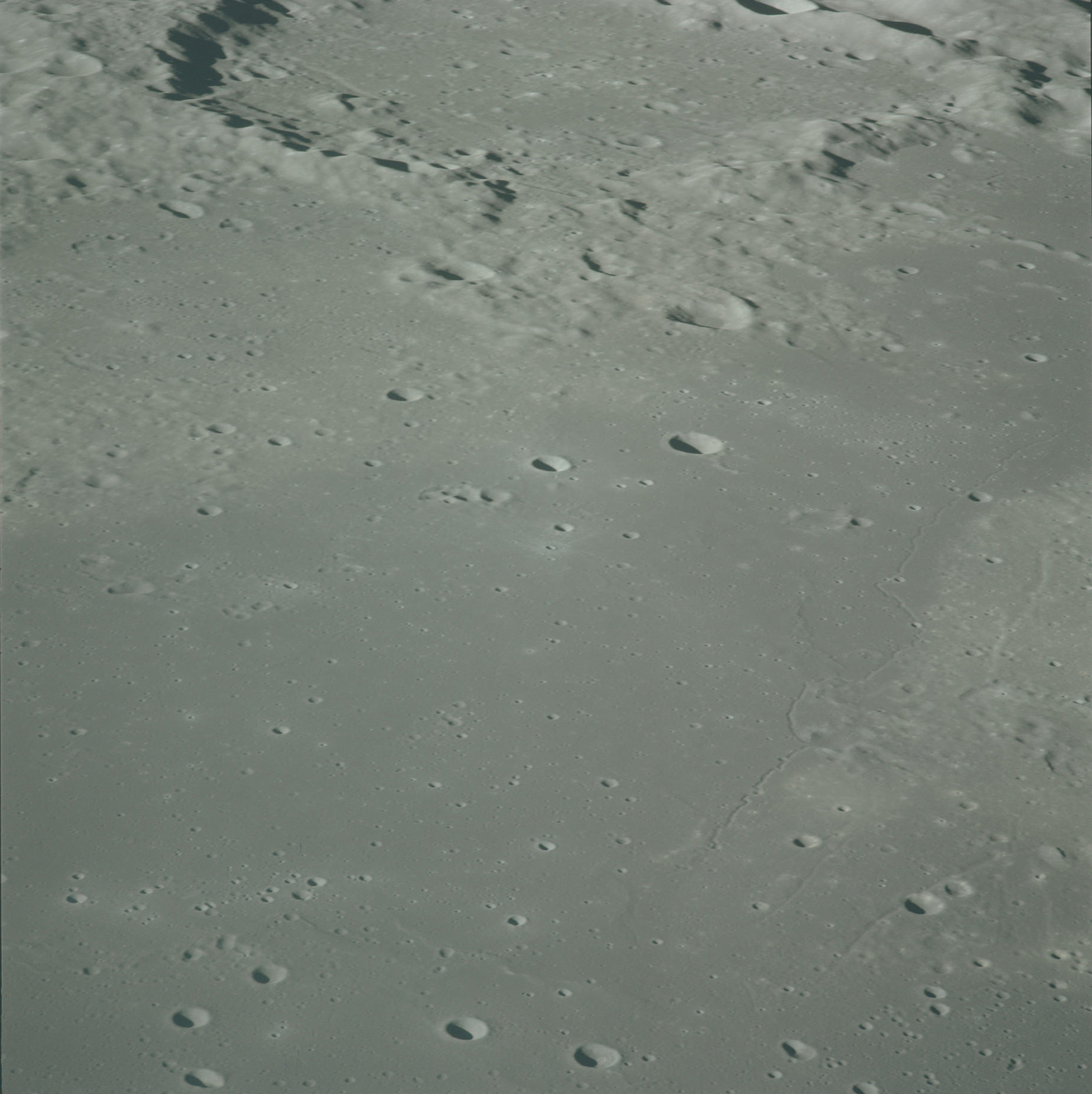
Oblique view from Apollo 16, facing south

Agatharchides is an irregular lunar impact crater located at the southern edge of Oceanus Procellarum, in the region between the Mare Humorum and Mare Nubium. To the east-southeast is the crater Bullialdus, and to the south-southwest lies Loewy.

Due to its irregular structure, Agatharchides needs to be examined under different lighting conditions to appreciate its distinct features. The interior of this heavily degraded crater has been inundated by lava in the past, resurfacing the floor. The damaged outer wall varies considerably in height, ranging from level with the surface to rising as high as 1.5 km. The most intact portions of the wall are along the east and the west-southwest, while the rim is nearly non-existent to the north and heavily damaged to the south. A small craterlet lies along the western rim. The interior floor is marked only by a few tiny craterlets, and a branch of the Rimae Hippalus.

This crater is named after the Greek geographer Agatharchides. The name was introduced into lunar nomenclature by Johann H. von Madler during 1834–1837. This designation was officially adopted by the International Astronomical Union in 1935.

== Agatharchides P - Novellas ==
The largest one of the satellite craters of Agatharchides, the heavily eroded remains of an almost totally vanished crater, Agatharchides P east-southeast of Agatharchides itself, was called Novellas by Hugh Percy Wilkins and Patrick Moore. This name was not officially recognized by the International Astronomical Union (IAU), although it is seen on older maps of the moon.

== Apollo 16 and The Helmet ==
During the mission of Apollo 16 in april 1972, the flat high albedo structure to the southeast and southwest of the hillock Herigonius eta, north-northwest of Agatharchides, was nicknamed The Helmet by the astronauts and by NASA scientists on earth. It was observed and photographed from orbit by CMP Ken Mattingly aboard Apollo 16's Command Module Casper. The Helmet is also noticeable on the photographic version of chart LAC 93 (page 186) in The Clementine Atlas of the Moon (Ben Bussey / Paul D. Spudis).

== Satellite craters ==
By convention these features are identified on lunar maps by placing the letter on the side of the crater midpoint that is closest to Agatharchides.

Agatharchides	Latitude	Longitude	Diameter
A	23.2° S	28.4° W	16 km
B	21.5° S	31.6° W	7 km
C	22.0° S	32.9° W	12 km
E	20.7° S	33.0° W	15 km
F	20.3° S	31.8° W	6 km
G	20.1° S	26.7° W	6 km
H	20.4° S	33.9° W	15 km
J	21.6° S	32.5° W	13 km
K	21.0° S	27.4° W	11 km
L	21.1° S	26.7° W	8 km
N	21.1° S	29.6° W	22 km
O	19.2° S	26.6° W	5 km
P	20.2° S	28.7° W	66 km
R	18.3° S	30.7° W	5 km
S	17.7° S	30.5° W	3 km
T	18.2° S	27.7° W	5 km
