= Kelvyn =

Kelyvn may refer to:

== People ==
- Kelvyn Jones (born 1953), British quantitative geography professor
- Kelvyn Bell (born 1956), American guitarist and vocalist
- Kelvyn Cullimore, Jr. (born 1958), American businessman and politician
- Kelvyn Alp (born 1971), New Zealand politician and activist
- Kelvyn Igwe (born 1987), Nigerian football defender
- Kelvyn Boy (born 1991), Kelvyn Brown, Ghanaian afrobeat singer
- Kelvyn (footballer) (born 1999), Kelvyn Ramos da Fonseca, Brazilian football left-back

== Places ==
- Kelvyn Park, park in Chicago, Illinois
- Kelvyn Park High School, high school in Chicago, Illinois

== See also ==
- Kelvin (disambiguation)
