= Lee (crater) =

Crater on the Moon

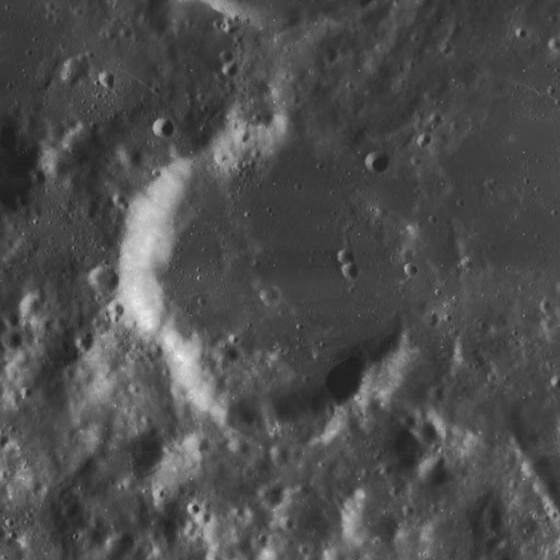
- Lunar Orbiter 4 image
- Coordinates: 30.7°S 40.7°W
- Diameter: 41 km
- Depth: 1.3 km
- Colongitude: 41° at sunrise
- Eponym: John Lee

Lee is the lava-flooded remnant of a lunar impact crater that lies on an inlet of the Mare Humorum, in the southwestern part of the Moon. It was named after British astronomer John Lee. To the east is the crater Vitello, and just to the north is the lava-flooded crater Doppelmayer.

The rim of Lee is worn and somewhat eroded, with a wide gap along the northeast where lava entered and covered the floor. The interior is relatively flat and free of significant impacts. The craterlet Lee A is attached to the exterior of the southern rim of Lee.

== Satellite craters ==
By convention these features are identified on lunar maps by placing the letter on the side of the crater midpoint that is closest to Lee.

Lee	Latitude	Longitude	Diameter
A	31.4° S	41.2° W	18 km
H	30.9° S	38.9° W	4 km
M	29.8° S	39.7° W	77 km
S	30.8° S	42.8° W	6 km
T	30.1° S	42.0° W	4 km
