= Loewy (crater) =

Crater on the Moon

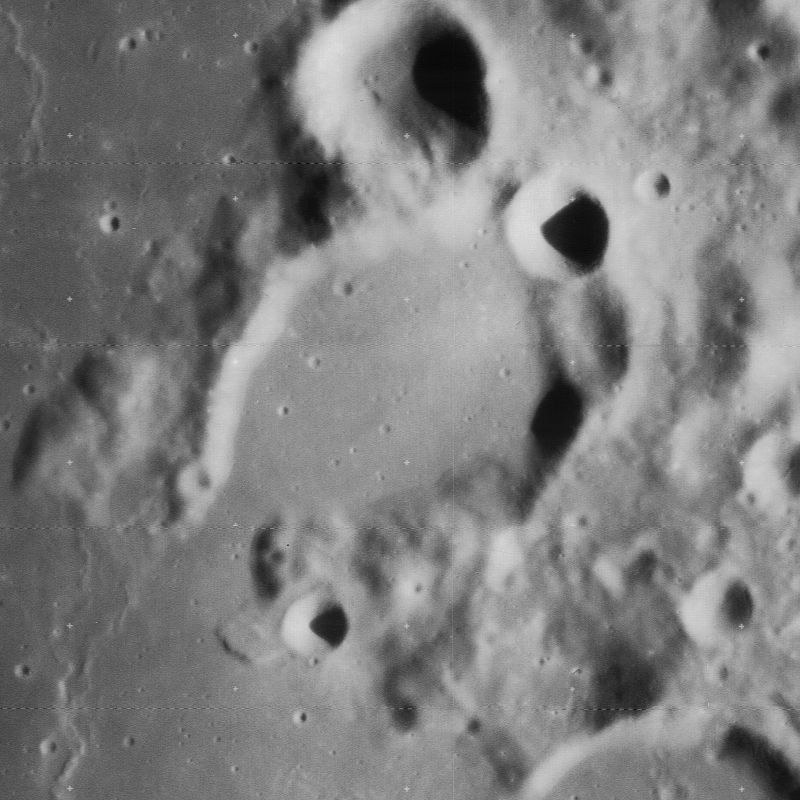
- Lunar Orbiter 4 image
- Coordinates: 22.7°S 32.8°W
- Diameter: 22 × 26 km
- Depth: 1.09 km (0.68 mi)
- Colongitude: 33° at sunrise
- Eponym: Maurice Loewy

Loewy is a small lunar impact crater that lies along the eastern rim of Mare Humorum, in the southwest part of the Moon's near side. It was named after French astronomer Maurice Loewy. This is a lava-flooded formation that lies to the southwest of the larger, lava-flooded crater Agatharchides. To the southeast is an even larger lava-flooded formation, Hippalus.

The rim of Loewy is worn and eroded, with a break in the southwest where lava may have flooded into the interior from the surrounding lunar mare. The formation is not quite circular, being somewhat elongated towards the southeast. There is a small craterlet, Loewy A, along the northeastern rim. The interior floor is level and nearly featureless. Attached to the northern exterior of the rim is Agatharchides C, a bowl-shaped crater.

== Satellite craters ==
By convention these features are identified on lunar maps by placing the letter on the side of the crater midpoint that is closest to Loewy.

Loewy	Latitude	Longitude	Diameter
A	22.3° S	32.5° W	7 km
B	23.2° S	32.9° W	4 km
G	23.0° S	31.9° W	5 km
H	22.8° S	31.9° W	5 km
