= Gassendi =

Gassendi may refer to:

== People ==
- Pierre Gassendi (1592–1655), French philosopher, scientist and mathematician
- Jean Jacques Basilien Gassendi (1748–1828), French Army general and politician
- Jean Gaspard Gassend or Gassendi (1749–1806), French priest and politician

== Other ==
- Gassendi (crater), a large crater on the Moon named after Pierre Gassendi
