= John Lee (astronomer) =

English astronomer

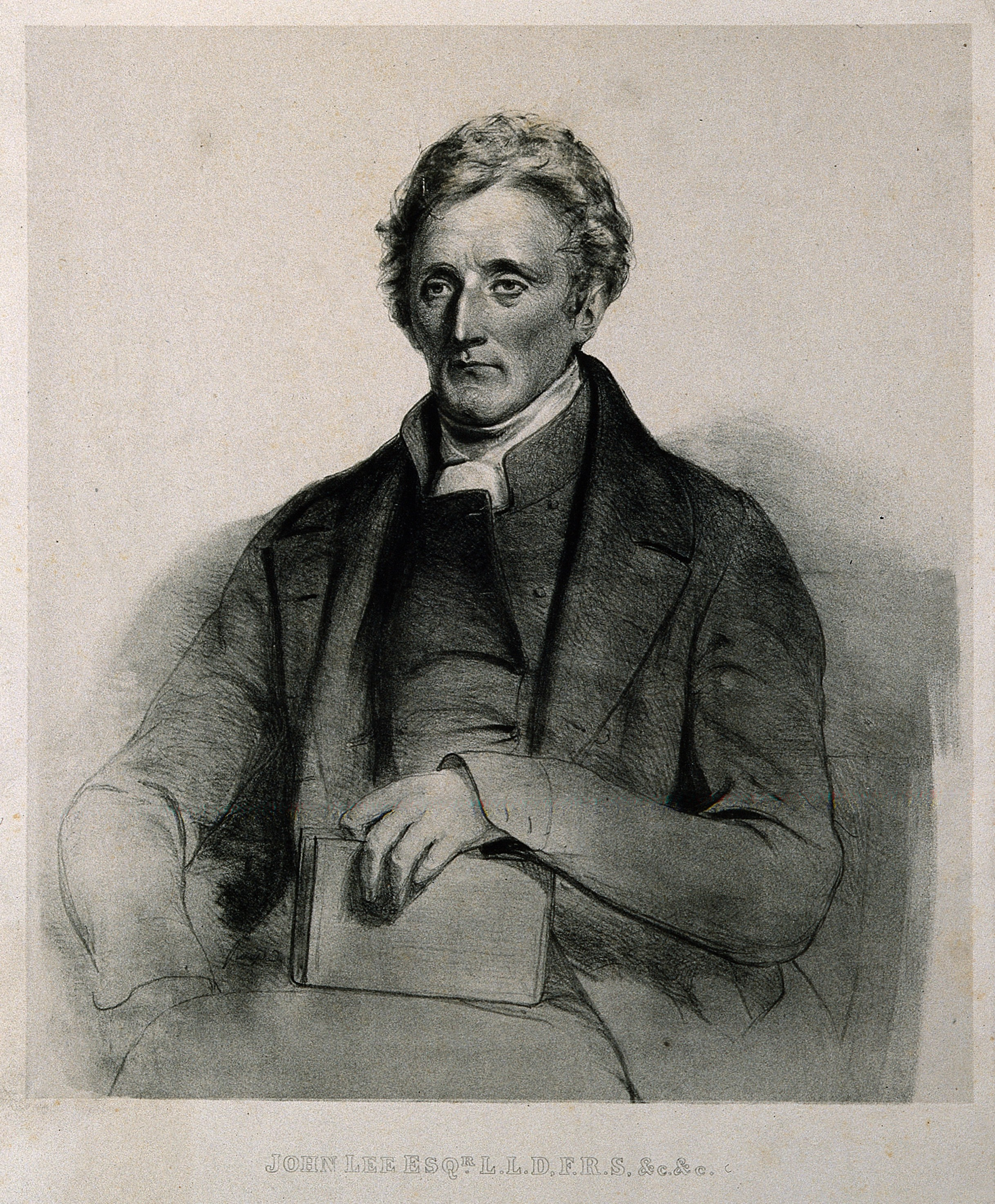
John Lee

John Lee FRS (né Fiott; 28 April 1783 – 25 February 1866), was an English philanthropist, astronomer, mathematician, antiquarian, barrister, and numismatist.

== Family ==
He was the eldest son of John Fiott and Harriet, daughter of William Lee, of Totteridge, MP for Appleby, of the family of the Lee baronets of Hartwell. His father was involved in the family counting house business and was a failed East India merchant. He was orphaned when young and was brought up by his maternal uncle, William Lee Antonie.

== Education ==
Lee read Mathematics at St John's College, Cambridge between 1802 and 1806, graduating fifth wrangler in his year. He was elected a fellow in 1808. Following his studies from 1807 to 1815 he travelled extensively in the Middle East and Europe as a travelling bachelor. During this time he gained an interest in antiquities.

== Personal life ==
He took the name Lee in 1816 following the death of his uncle William Lee Antonie in 1815. In 1833 Lee married Cecilia Rutter (23 July 1782 – 1 April 1854), of Lymington, whom he described as of "humble station but excellent character and good disposition". She died in 1854 and was buried in the graveyard of Hartwell Church, in Buckinghamshire. In 1855, he married again, this time to Louisa Catherine, daughter of Lee's friend Robert Wilkinson, who ran a private school at Totteridge Park, the old Lee family seat (other sources indicate her to be daughter of Richard Ford Heath, of Uxbridge).

Lee died at Hartwell House in 1866. An obituary was published the following year in the monthly notices of the Royal Astronomical Society.

== Estates ==
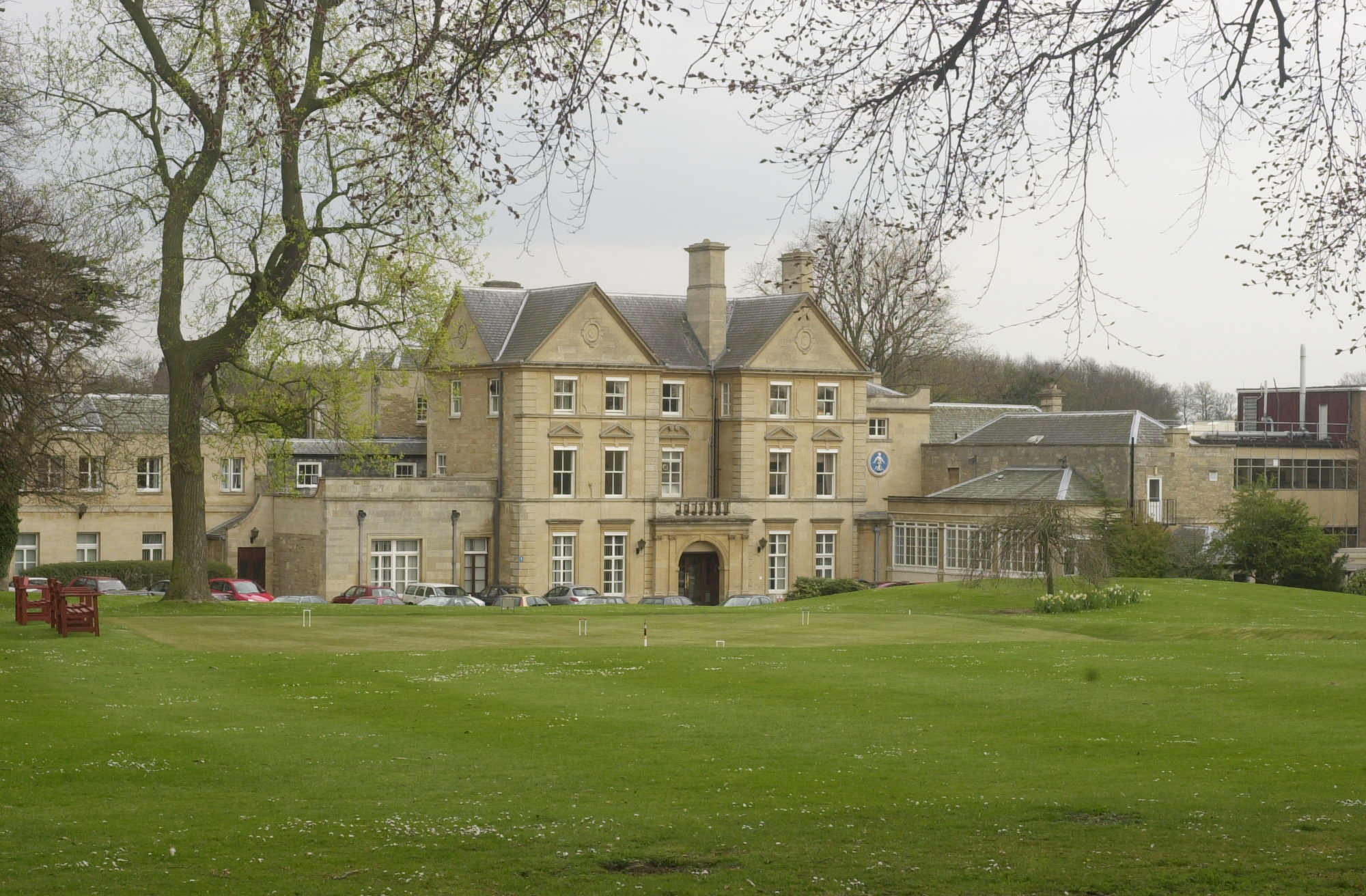
Colworth House

Lee inherited several properties from William Lee Antonie in 1815. Antonie's will predicated the inheritance on Lee changing his name by royal licence from Fiott. The properties included Colworth House near Sharnbrook in Bedfordshire and Totteridge Park, Buckinghamshire (formerly in Hertfordshire). In 1827, Lee inherited Hartwell House, Buckinghamshire and all the Lee family estates on the death of Sir George Lee, 6th and last Baronet; this became his main residence from 1829 until his death.

Lee would "invite thirty or forty scientists to stay with him for anything up to a month, discussing their latest theories" "year after year"; these regular guests included William Henry Smyth and his daughter Henrietta, mother of Scouting founder Robert Baden-Powell, 1st Baron Baden-Powell. His scholarly nature meant Lee cared nothing for "the aristocratic world which his house so vividly evoked" for visitors. He dressed plainly, and was opposed to any indulgence in tobacco and alcohol.

Lee had no children; he was succeeded in his estates by his nephew Edward Dyke Lee, only surviving son of his brother Nicholas Fiott, later Lee.

== Scientific work ==
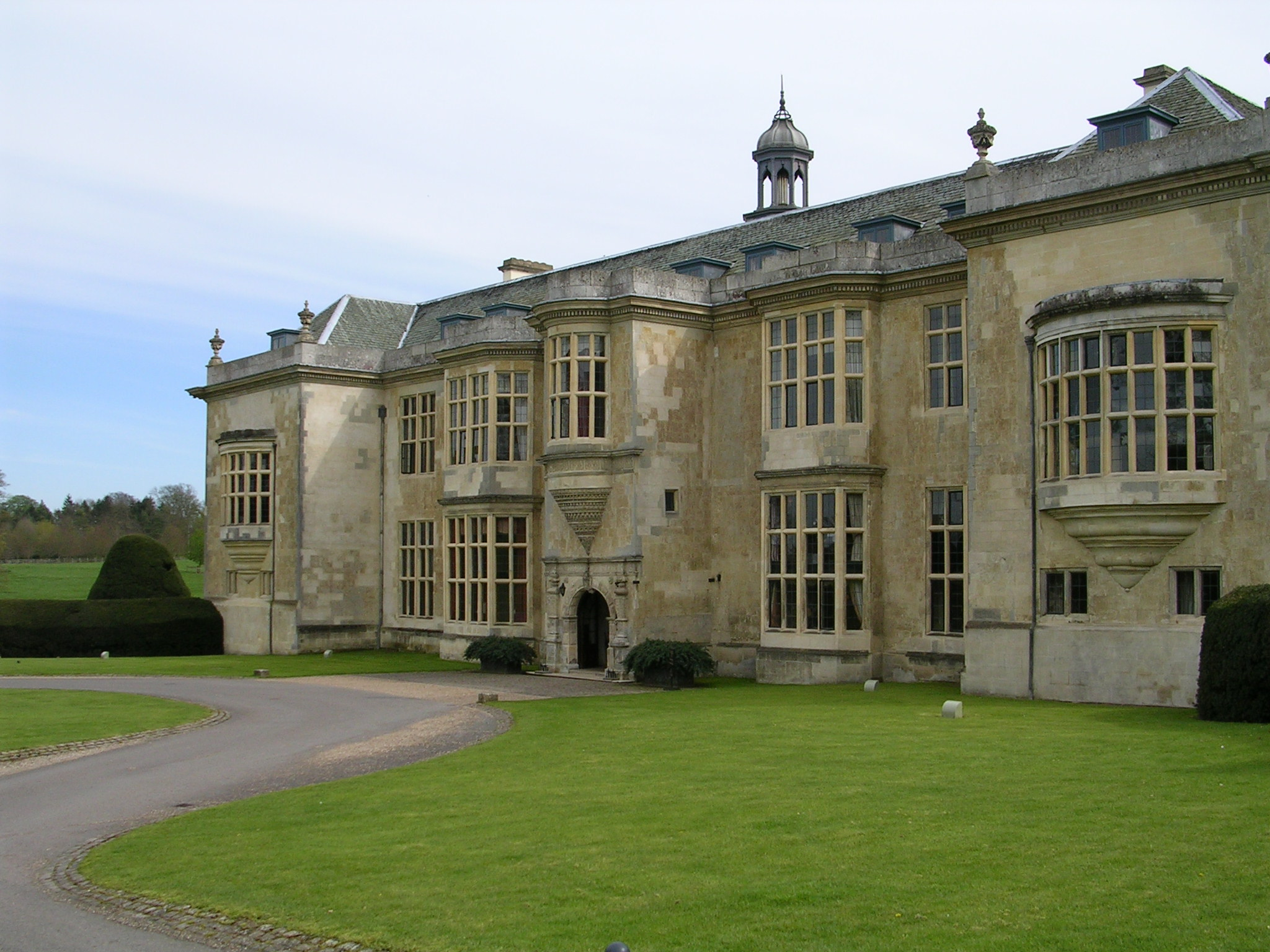
Hartwell House

Between 1830 and 1839, Lee built an astronomical observatory in the south-west corner of Hartwell House. Lee helped found the Royal Meteorological Society in 1850 and was its president from 1855 to 1857.

On 14 May 1824, Lee was elected as fellow of the Royal Astronomical Society and was its president between 1861 and 1863. He became a Fellow of the Society of Antiquaries of London in 1828 and a Fellow of the Philological Society in 1831. Lee was elected a Fellow of the Royal Society in 1831 and the first president of the Numismatic Society of London in 1836. He also served as Chairman of the London Peace Society.

In 1863 at the age of 80, he was made a barrister of Gray's Inn and a Q.C. the following year. The lunar crater Lee is named after him.
