= Agatharchides =

2nd-century BC Ancient Greek historian

Agatharchides or Agatharchus (Ancient Greek: Ἀγαθαρχίδης or Ἀγάθαρχος, Agatharchos) of Cnidus was a Greek historian and geographer (flourished 2nd century BC).

== Life ==
Agatharchides is believed to have been born at Cnidus, hence his appellation. As Stanley M. Burstein notes, the "evidence for Agatharchides' life is meagre." Photius describes him as a threptos, a kind of assistant of servile origin, to Cinnaeus and states that he was later a secretary to Heraclides Lembus. Cinnaeus served as a counselor to Ptolemy VI; Heraclides is best known for negotiating the treaty that ended Antiochus IV's invasion of Egypt in 169 BC.

Agatharchides furnishes few clues about his own life. At the conclusion of his On the Erythraean Sea, he apologizes for being unable to complete his work "since our age is unable to similarly bear the toil" and "as a result of the disturbances in Egypt" he could no longer access the official records (a fragment cited by Photius in his Bibliotheca Cod. 250.110, 460b). There are two possible occasions when this could have happened: the first was in 145 BC, when Ptolemy VIII purged Alexandria of the intellectuals who supported his rivals for the throne; and in 132 BC after Ptolemy, who had been driven from his kingdom by a rebellion in Alexandria, returned and exacted reprisals on that city. While most scholars have favored the later date, Burstein argues for the earlier one.

Extracts from the first book of his Erythraean Sea, written in the first person and advocating a military campaign into the lands south of Egypt, led early scholars to deduce that Agatharchides was an important political figure of his time, and served as a guardian to one of the sons of Ptolemy VIII. Dodwell endeavored to show that it the younger son, Alexander, and objects to Soter, that he reigned conjointly with his mother. This, however, was the case with Alexander likewise. Wesseling and Henry Fynes Clinton think the elder brother to be the one meant, for Soter was more likely to have been a minor on his accession in 117 BC than Alexander in 107 BC, ten years after their father's death; the second edition of the Oxford Classical Dictionary article on Agatharchides agrees that the son was Soter. Moreover, Dodwell's date would leave too short an interval between the publication of Agatharchides's work on the Erythraean Sea (about 113 BC), and the work of Artemidorus. However at least as early as 1810, when B. G. Niebuhr pointed out that these excerpts were from a speech, and not part of the narrative of his book, this theory has been recognized as conflicting with other known historical facts.

== Writings ==
Agatharchides was not well known in ancient times. Of his two major works, Affairs in Asia (Ta kata ten Asian) in ten books, and Affairs in Europe (Ta kata ten Europen) in forty-nine books, only a few fragments survive, too few to provide us with any sense of the contents of either work. However, for his On the Erythraean Sea (Peri tes Erythras Thalasses or De Mari Erythraeo) in five books, almost the entire fifth book, a geographical treatise on the Horn of Africa and the lands around the Red Sea, has survived almost intact. According to Burstein, "the comparative soberness of Agatharchides' treatment compared to previous accounts and the wealth of information contained in it led to a quick recognition ... [that it was] a valuable summary of the results of Ptolemaic exploration."

In the first book of On the Erythraean Sea was a discussion respecting the origin of the name. In the fifth Agatharchides described the mode of life amongst the Sabaeans in Arabia, and the Ichthyophagi, or fish-eaters, the way in which elephants were caught by the elephant-eaters, and the mode of working the gold mines in the mountains of Egypt, near the Red Sea. His account of the Ichthyophagi and of the mode of working the gold mines, has been copied by Diodorus (iii.12-18). Amongst other extraordinary animals he mentions the camelopard, which was found in the country of the Troglodytae, and the rhinoceros.

Material from this book is quoted directly or indirectly by Diodorus Siculus, Strabo, Pliny the Elder, Aelian (Claudius Aelianus), Josephus and other authors. Although Agatharchides' work was superseded by more detailed accounts in the 2nd century AD, Photius found a copy of Erythraean Sea in the 9th century, from which he preserved extensive extracts in his Bibliotheca. Photius states that Agatharchides wrote in the Attic dialect, with a style that was dignified and perspicuous, and abounded in sententious passages—inspiring a favorable opinion from Photius. In the composition of his speeches Agatharchides was an imitator of Thucydides, whom he equalled in dignity and excelled in clearness. He was acquainted with the language of the Aethiopians (de Rubr. M. p. 46), and appears to have been the first who discovered the true cause of the yearly inundations of the Nile. (Diod. i. 41.)

Josephus quoted a passage by Agatharchides about the Jews' failure to defend their city against the army Ptolemy I Soter because the attack occurred on Shabbat, the Jewish holy day of rest. Although some scholars view this passage as antisemitic, it appears to form part of Agatharchides' critique of superstition rather than an attack on Jews, as evidenced by another example he uses, that of a Hellenistic princess.

An Agatharchides, of Samos, is mentioned by Plutarch, as the author of a work on Persia, and one περὶ λίθων. J.A. Fabricius, however, conjectures that the true reading is Agathyrsides, not Agatharchides. (Dodwell in Hudson's Geogr. Script. Gr. Minores; Clinton, Fasti Hell. iii, p. 535.)

== Namesake ==
The crater Agatharchides on the Moon is named in his honour.

== See also ==
- Periplus of the Erythraean Sea
