= Frith Lake (Thunder Bay District) =

- lac Frith
- Location in Ontario
- Location: Thunder Bay District, Ontario
- Coordinates: 49°52′29″N 88°40′42″W
- Type: Lake
- Part of: Great Lakes Basin
- Primary outflows: unnamed creek
- Basin countries: Canada
- Max. length: 1.9 kilometres (1.2 mi)
- Max. width: 1.1 kilometres (0.68 mi)
- Surface elevation: 293 metres (961 ft)

Frith Lake (French: lac Frith) is a lake in the Unorganized Part of Thunder Bay District in northwestern Ontario, Canada. The lake is on Kelvin Island, a large island in Lake Nipigon, and is thus in the Great Lakes Basin.

== Hydrology ==
The lake is 1.9 kilometres (1.2 mi) long and 1.1 kilometres (0.68 mi) wide, and lies at an elevation of 293 metres (961 ft). It is on Kelvin Island, a large island in Lake Nipigon, making Frith Lake a lake on an island in a lake. Frith Lake itself has a small islet.

There are three unnamed inflows, at the west, southwest, and east. The primary outflow is an unnamed creek at the northwest that flows to northwest Lake Nipigon, and then via the Nipigon River to Lake Superior.

== Natural history ==
The lake is part of the Lake Nipigon Conservation Reserve.
