= Kelvin (surname) =

Kelvin is a surname. Notable people with this surname include:

- Arthur Kelvin (born 1869), Scottish footballer
- Ray Kelvin (born 1955), British businessman
- Rob Kelvin (born 1944), Australian newsman
- Kris Kelvin, a fictional character, the protagonist of the novel Solaris by Stanislaw Lem and in three films based on the novel

== See also ==
- Lord Kelvin (William Thomson, 1st Baron Kelvin, 1824–1907), British engineer and physicist, the namesake of the kelvin temperature unit
- Kelvin (given name)
