= Puiseux (crater) =

Crater on the Moon

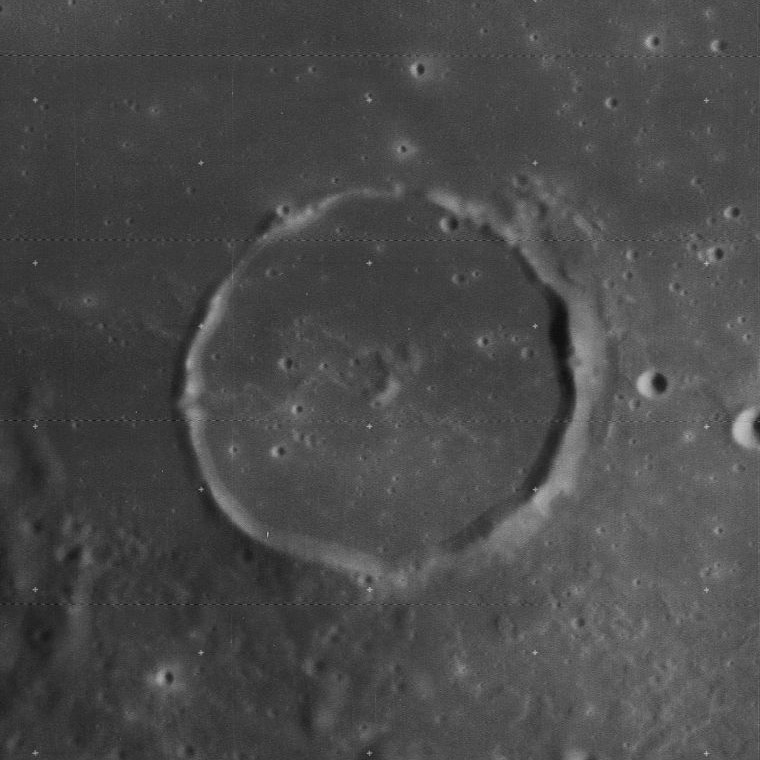
- Lunar Orbiter 4 image
- Coordinates: 27.82°S 39.19°W
- Diameter: 24.95 km (15.50 mi)
- Depth: 0.4 km (0.25 mi)
- Colongitude: 39° at sunrise
- Eponym: Pierre Puiseux

Puiseux is the remnant of a lunar impact crater that has been almost completely submerged by lava. It is located near the southern end of Mare Humorum, to the north east of the ruined crater Doppelmayer. To the south-southeast is Vitello.

Of the original structure of Puiseux, only the upper part of the rim remains above the mare surface. There are some small craters within the interior floor, and a low hill is at the center.

It was named by the IAU in 1935 after French astronomer Pierre Puiseux.

== Satellite craters ==
By convention these features are identified on lunar maps by placing the letter on the side of the crater midpoint that is closest to Puiseux.

Puiseux	Latitude	Longitude	Diameter
A	26.5° S	39.7° W	3 km
B	25.7° S	38.8° W	4 km
C	24.7° S	37.8° W	3 km
D	25.7° S	36.1° W	7 km
F	23.4° S	38.8° W	4 km
G	28.2° S	37.8° W	3 km
H	27.4° S	37.0° W	3 km
