= Bertrand–Diguet–Puiseux theorem =

Theorem in differential geometry

In the mathematical study of the differential geometry of surfaces, the Bertrand–Diguet–Puiseux theorem expresses the Gaussian curvature of a surface in terms of the circumference of a geodesic circle, or the area of a geodesic disc. The theorem is named for Joseph Bertrand, Victor Puiseux, and Charles François Diguet.

Let p be a point on a smooth surface M. The geodesic circle of radius r centered at p is the set of all points whose geodesic distance from p is equal to r. Let C(r) denote the circumference of this circle, and A(r) denote the area of the disc contained within the circle. The Bertrand–Diguet–Puiseux theorem asserts that

$$K(p) = \lim_{r\to 0^+} 3\frac{2\pi r-C(r)}{\pi r^3} = \lim_{r\to 0^+} 12\frac{\pi r^2-A(r)}{\pi r^4}.$$

The theorem is closely related to the Gauss–Bonnet theorem.
