= Doppelmayer (crater) =

Crater on the Moon

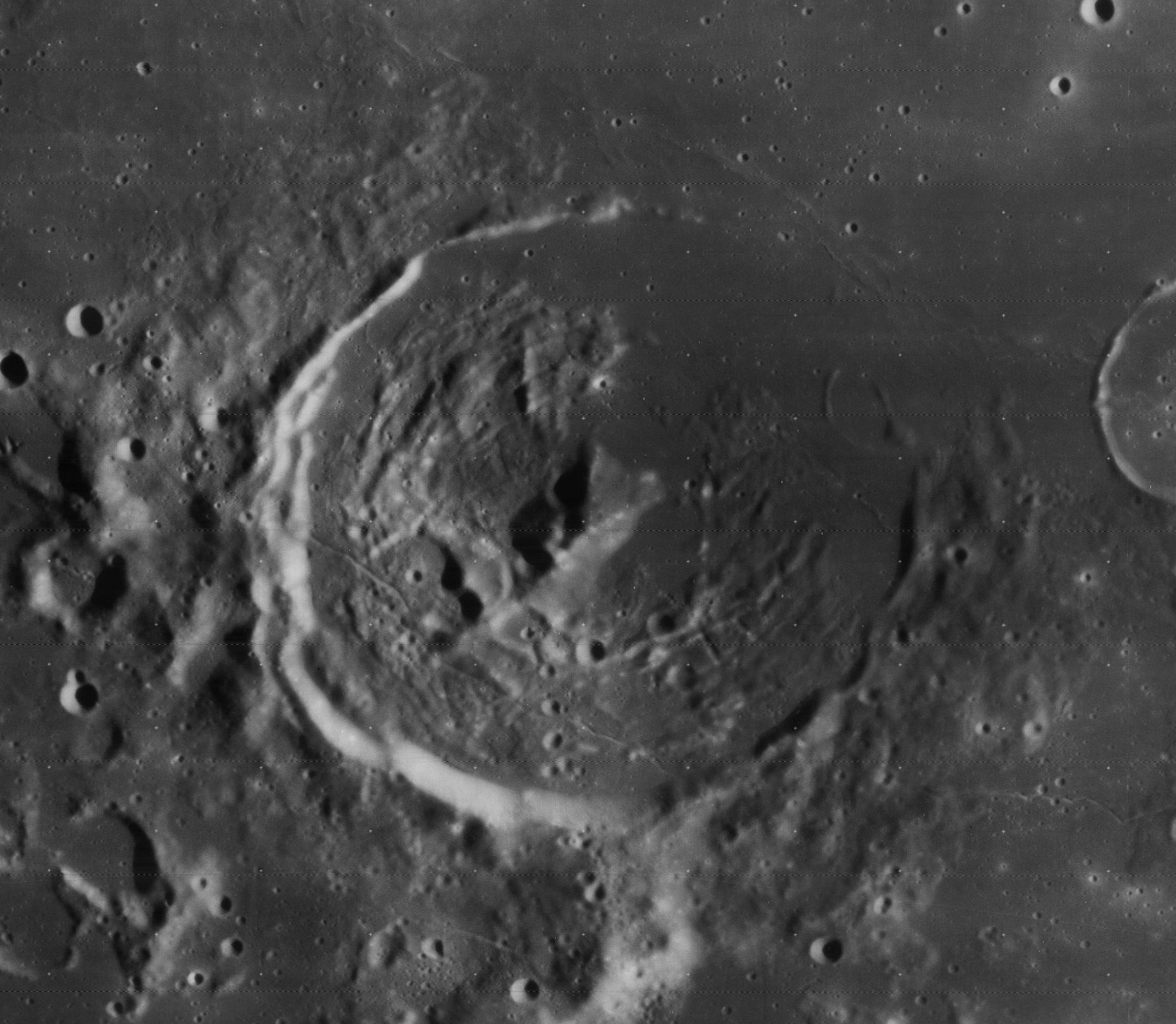
- Lunar Orbiter 4 image
- Coordinates: 28.48°S 41.51°W
- Diameter: 65.08 km (40.44 mi)
- Depth: 1.1 km (0.68 mi)
- Colongitude: 41° at sunrise
- Formation: Nectarian
- Eponym: Johann Gabriel Doppelmayr

Doppelmayer is the basalt-flooded remains of a lunar impact crater that lies on the southwest edge of Mare Humorum. To the south-southeast is another flooded crater designated Lee, and to the southeast is Vitello. Just to the east-northeast of Doppelmayer lies the nearly submerged crater Puiseux.

This formation dates to the Nectarian epoch of the lunar geologic timescale. The rim of Doppelmayer is nearly round, but is worn and eroded. The most intact section is the southwest half, while in the northeast the rim descends beneath the mare, leaving only a slight rise in the surface.

The interior has been partially flooded by lava, leaving a large raised ridge in the center. A small range of hills curves to the west and north from the southern end of this ridge, forming a feature that is nearly concentric with the crater's outer rim. The floor of the crater that is not covered by lava is fractured. To the west of this formation is the slender rilles of Rimae Doppelmayer, which requires a 150 mm (6 in) telescope and ideal seeing conditions to resolve.

This formation is named after the German mathematician and astronomer Johann Gabriel Doppelmayr (1671-1750). His name was introduced into lunar nomenclature during the 18th century by German astronomer Johann H. Schröter. Its designation was formally adopted by the International Astronomical Union in 1935.

== Satellite craters ==
By convention these features are identified on lunar maps by placing the letter on the side of the crater midpoint that is closest to Doppelmayer.

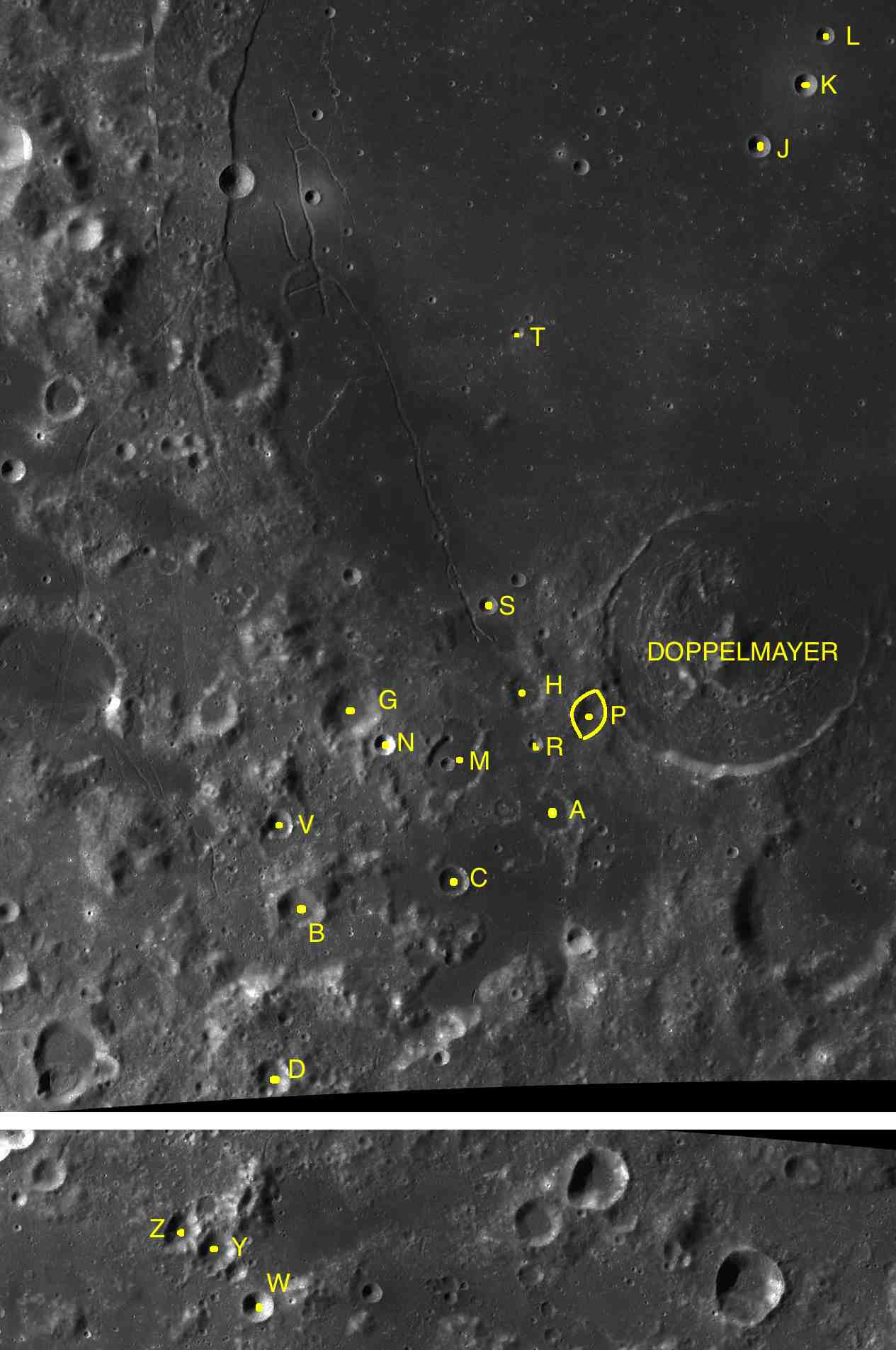
Satellite features of Doppelmayer

| Doppelmayer | Latitude | Longitude | Diameter |
|---|---|---|---|
| A | 29.8° S | 43.1° W | 10 km |
| B | 30.5° S | 45.4° W | 11 km |
| C | 30.3° S | 44.1° W | 7 km |
| D | 31.8° S | 45.8° W | 9 km |
| G | 28.9° S | 44.9° W | 15 km |
| H | 28.8° S | 43.2° W | 10 km |
| J | 24.5° S | 41.1° W | 6 km |
| K | 24.0° S | 40.7° W | 5 km |
| L | 23.6° S | 40.5° W | 4 km |
| M | 29.5° S | 43.9° W | 15 km |
| N | 29.2° S | 44.6° W | 5 km |
| P | 29.1° S | 42.7° W | 8 km |
| R | 29.2° S | 43.2° W | 4 km |
| S | 28.1° S | 43.6° W | 4 km |
| T | 25.9° S | 43.2° W | 3 km |
| V | 29.8° S | 45.6° W | 8 km |
| W | 33.6° S | 45.6° W | 8 km |
| Y | 33.1° S | 46.1° W | 10 km |
| Z | 33.0° S | 46.4° W | 10 km |
