= Maurice Loewy =

French astronomer

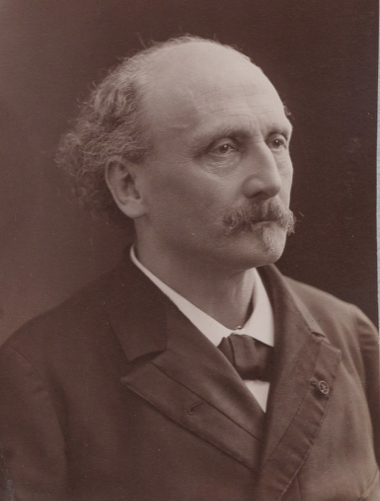
Maurice Loewy

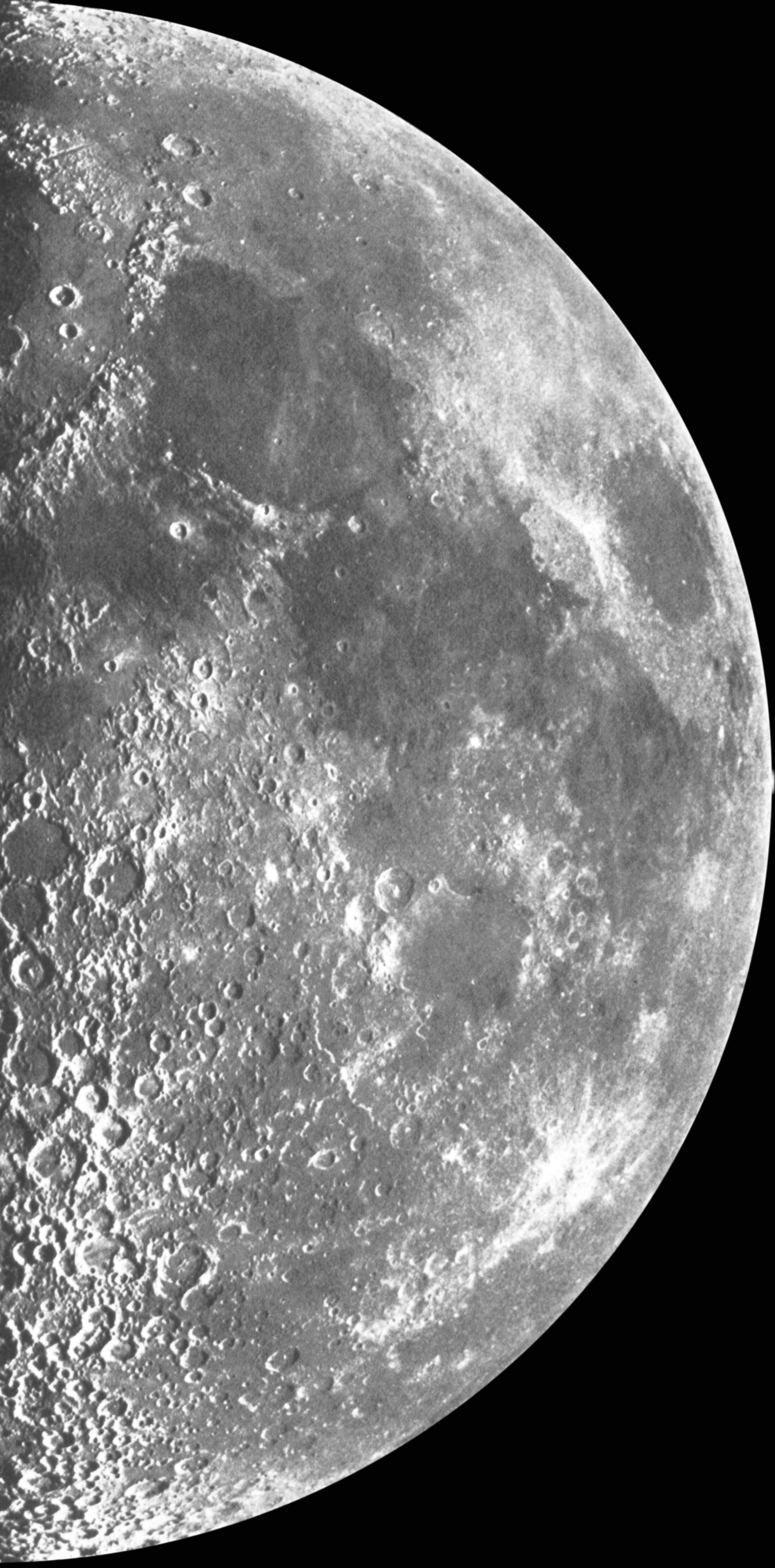
Surface of the Moon, photographed by Loewy and Puiseux in 1894

Maurice (Moritz) Loewy (15 April 1833 – 15 October 1907) was a French astronomer.

Loewy was born in Vienna. Loewy's Jewish parents moved to Vienna in 1841 to escape the antisemitism of their home town. Loewy became an assistant at the Vienna Observatory, working on celestial mechanics. However, the institutions of Austria-Hungary did not permit a Jew to advance to a senior position without renouncing his faith and embracing Catholicism. The director of the observatory Karl L. Littrow was a correspondent of Urbain Le Verrier, director of the Paris Observatory and he secured a position there for Loewy in 1860. After going to France, Loewy become a naturalised French citizen.

He worked on the orbits of asteroids and comets and on the measurement of longitude, improving the accuracy of the Connaissance des Temps. He also worked on optics and the elimination of the aberration of light.

He was elected a member of the Bureau des Longitudes in 1872 and of the Académie des Sciences in 1873.

Loewy became director of the Paris Observatory in 1896, reorganising the institution and establishing a department of physical astronomy. He further spent a decade working with Pierre Puiseux on an atlas of the Moon composed of 10,000 photographs, L’Atlas photographique de la Lune (1910), the definitive basis for lunar geography for over half a century. The crater Loewy on the Moon is named after him and asteroid 253 Mathilde is believed to be named after his wife.

He died in Paris at a government meeting of a sudden and unanticipated cardiac arrest.

== Honours ==
- Gold Medal of the Royal Astronomical Society, (1889)
