= Kelvin Grove =

Kelvin Grove or Kelvingrove may refer to:

- Kelvin Grove, Calgary, a neighbourhood of Calgary, Alberta, Canada
- Kelvin Grove, Queensland, a suburb of Brisbane, Queensland, Australia
- Kelvin Grove, Palmerston North, a suburb of Palmerston North, New Zealand
- Kelvin Grove Beach and Marine Park in Lions Bay, British Columbia, Canada
- Glasgow Kelvingrove (UK Parliament constituency)
- Kelvingrove Art Gallery and Museum, Glasgow, Scotland
- Kelvingrove Park, Glasgow, Scotland
- Kelvingrove, Glasgow, an area of Glasgow, Scotland
