= Kelvin Kent =

Kelvin Kent may refer to:

- Kelvin Kent (mountaineer), British mountaineer and adventurer
- Kelvin Kent (writer), pseudonym for the American fantasy and science fiction author Henry Kuttner
