= Johann Gabriel Doppelmayr =

German astronomer (1677–1750)

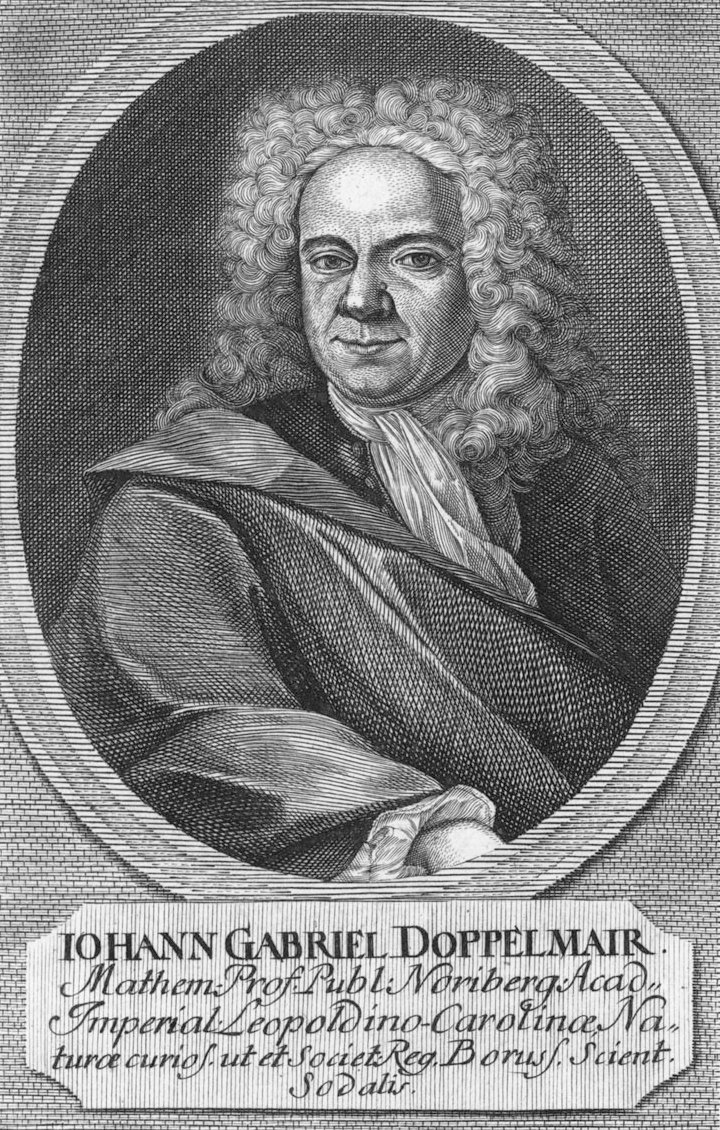
Johann Gabriel Doppelmayr.

Johann Gabriel Doppelmayr (27 September 1677 – 1 December 1750) was a German mathematician, astronomer, and cartographer. (His surname is also spelled Doppelmayer and Doppelmair.)

== Professional life and publications ==
He was born in Nuremberg, the son of the merchant Johann Siegmund Doppelmayr. He entered the Aegidien-Gymnasium in Nuremberg in 1689, then the University of Altdorf in 1696. His studies included mathematics, physics, and jurisprudence. Later he continued his studies in Halle and graduated in 1698 with a dissertation on the Sun.

During studying at the University of Halle, he also learned French and Italian. After giving up his legal studies he then spent two years travelling and studying in Germany, Holland, and England, spending time at Utrecht, Leiden, Oxford, and London, during which time he learned to speak French, Italian, and English. He continued to study astronomy and learned to grind and figure his own telescope lenses.

His career was academic, and he became professor of mathematics at the Aegidien-Gymnasium from 1704 until his death. He is not noted for any discoveries, but he did publish several works of a scientific nature. His publications covered topics on mathematics and astronomy, including sundials, spherical trigonometry, and celestial maps and globes. One of his works also included useful biographical information on several hundred mathematicians and instrument makers of Nuremberg.

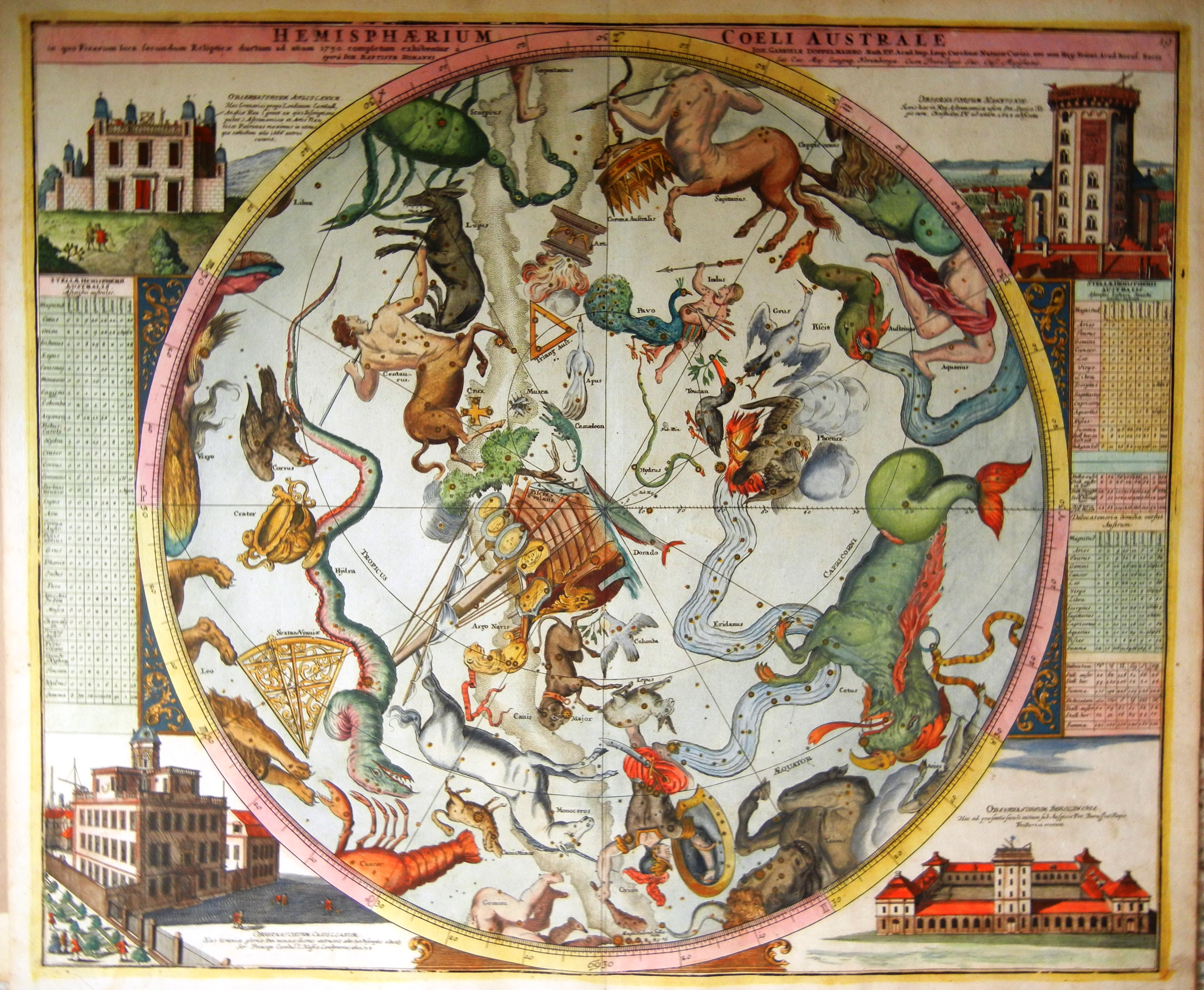
Doppelmayr's celestial map of the southern hemisphere published in Atlas Coelestis in quo Mundus Spectabilis..., decorated with vignettes of the astronomical observatories at Greenwich, Copenhagen, Cassel, and Berlin.

Doppelmayr developed a close relationship with the Dominican friar and cartographer Johann Batist Homann, the founder of a famous cartographic publishing firm. In the early 1700s, Doppelmayr prepared a number of astronomical plates that had appeared in Homann's atlases, which in 1742 were collected and issued as the Atlas Coelestis in quo Mundus Spectabilis... The atlas contained 30 plates, 20 of which treated astronomical themes and historical development, including Copernicus's and Tycho Brahe's cosmological systems, illustration of planetary motion and the Solar System, and a detail of the Moon's surface based on telescopic advances. The remaining ten plates were actual star charts, including hemispheres centered on the equatorial poles. Two other plates were hemispheres centered on the ecliptic poles with an external orientation (i.e., representing the stars as if seen from the outside looking in, as opposed to from the perspective of an earth observer, the preferred orientation for modern celestial maps), featuring contemporary illustrations of European observatories, which Doppelmayr visited during his travels.

== Personal life ==
Doppelmayr married Susanna Maria Kellner in 1716. The couple had four children of whom one survived. Doppelmayr became a member of several scientific societies, notably the Berlin Academy, the Royal Society in 1733, and the St. Petersburg Academy of Sciences (1740).

== Legacy ==
The crater Doppelmayer on the Moon was named after him by Johann Hieronymus Schröter in 1791. The minor planet 12622 Doppelmayr is also named in his honour.
