= Vitello (crater) =

Crater on the Moon

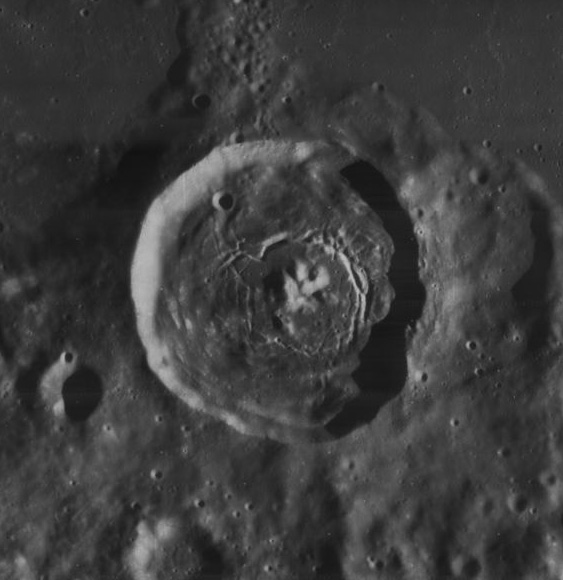
- Lunar Orbiter 4 image
- Coordinates: 30.42°S 37.55°W
- Diameter: 42.51 km (26.41 mi)
- Depth: 1.7 km (1.1 mi)
- Colongitude: 37° at sunrise
- Eponym: Vitello

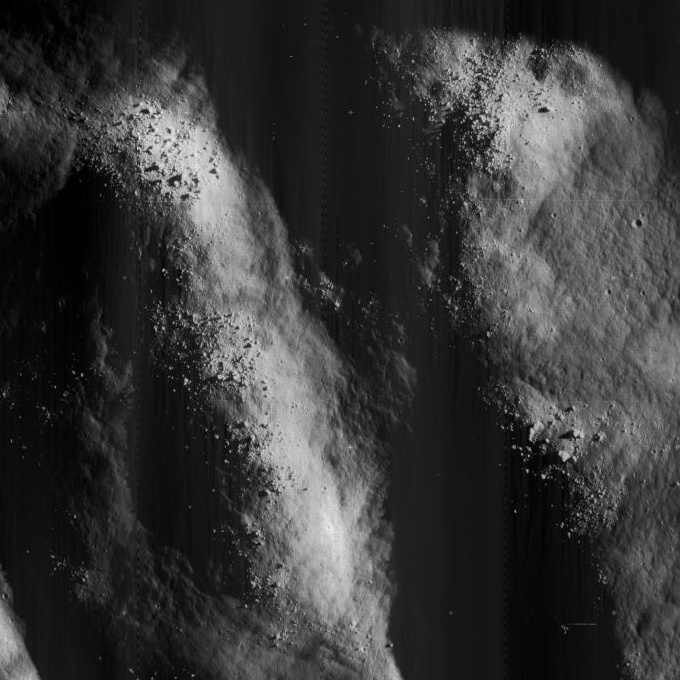
Lunar Orbiter 5 closeup of an area west of the central peak, showing large boulders on the surface.

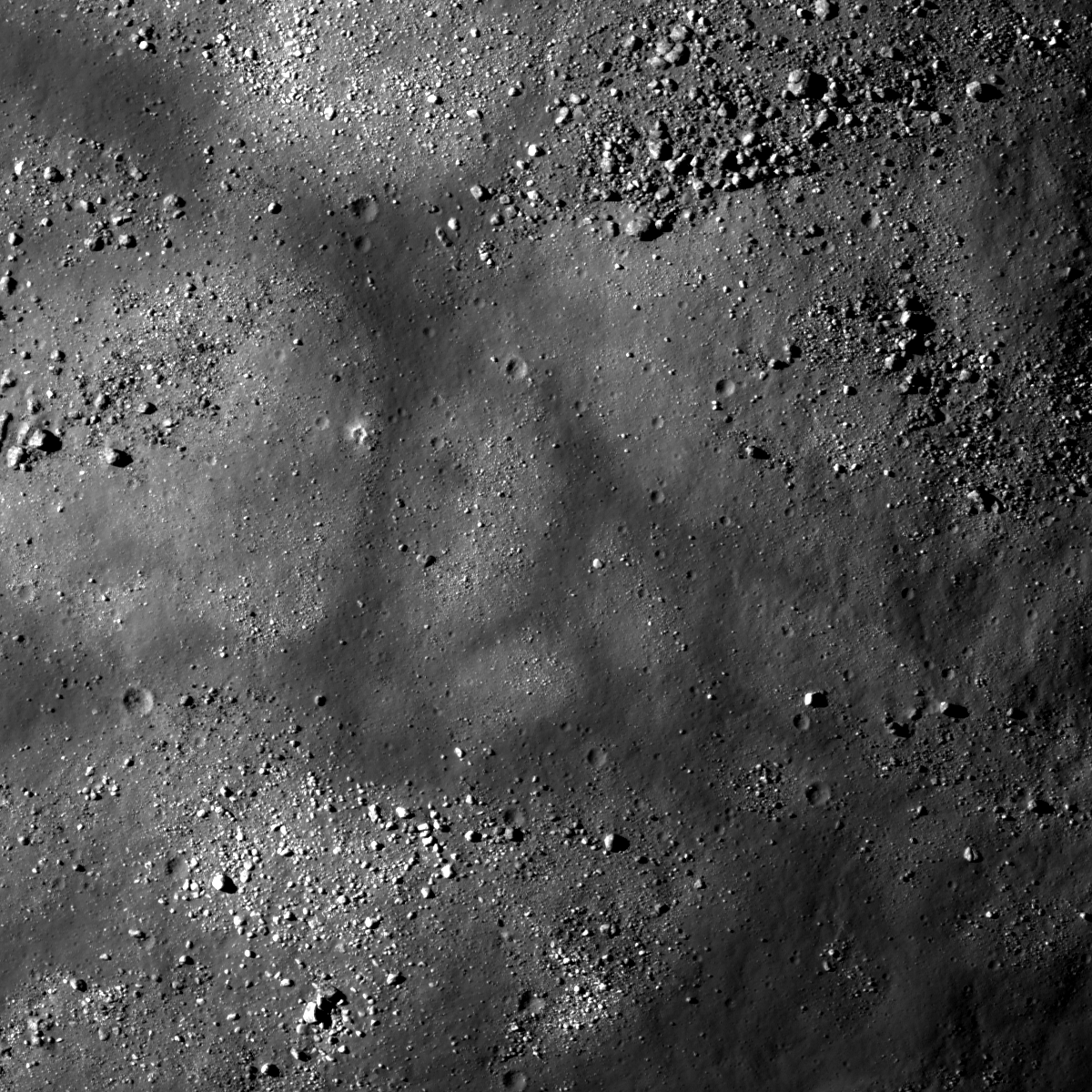
LRO image of the pattern of dark deposits at the crest of the central peak of Vitello

Vitello is a lunar impact crater that lies along the southern edge of Mare Humorum, in the southwest part of the Moon's near side. It was named after 13th century Polish theologian and physicist Vitello. T. W. Webb notes it "is almost unique in having, within a second concentric rampart, a central peak overlooking the whole ring".

This crater lies just to the east of the lava-flooded crater Lee. To the northeast along the edge of the lunar mare is the Rupes Kelvin, an irregular fault line.

== Description ==
On the lunar geologic timescale, Vitello dates from the Early (Lower) Imbrian period. This crater has a low, roughly circular rim with a sharp edge. The interior floor is irregular, rugged and hilly, with a ring of deep fractures surrounding the central peak. These cracks make it a floor-fractured crater. The infrared spectrum of pure crystalline plagioclase has been identified on the central peak and floor. A low ridge projects out from the northwest rim into the mare. Sites within and around the crater appear rich in the mineral ilmenite, particularly to the west of the rim.

Vitello was once believed to be a caldera rather than an impact crater. In To A Rocky Moon, lunar geologist Don Wilhelms summarized: It "is a Saari-Shorthill infrared hotspot, is fractured, and is blanketed and surrounded by a dark deposit. If there is a caldera on the moon, this ought to be it." However, Lunar Orbiter 5 acquired high-resolution images of the interior and geologists noted that the fractures were filled with boulders which caused the infrared anomaly, and so volcanic heat was not escaping from Vitello. Wilhelms concluded "...if it is a caldera, its activity expired long ago."

== Satellite craters ==
By convention these features are identified on lunar maps by placing the letter on the side of the crater midpoint that is closest to Vitello.

Vitello	Latitude	Longitude	Diameter
A	34.1° S	41.9° W	21 km
B	31.1° S	35.4° W	11 km
C	32.4° S	42.5° W	14 km
D	33.2° S	41.0° W	18 km
E	29.2° S	35.8° W	7 km
G	32.3° S	37.6° W	10 km
H	32.8° S	43.0° W	12 km
K	31.9° S	37.6° W	13 km
L	31.6° S	35.3° W	7 km
M	32.4° S	36.0° W	7 km
N	32.1° S	36.1° W	5 km
P	31.2° S	38.4° W	9 km
R	33.0° S	37.0° W	3 km
S	30.8° S	35.2° W	6 km
T	33.8° S	39.6° W	9 km
X	32.2° S	40.6° W	8 km
