= Kelvyn Igwe =

Nigerian footballer

Ajuluchukwu Kelvin Igwe
Personal information
- Full name: Kelvin Ajuluchukwu Igwe
- Date of birth: 26 March 1987 (age 39)
- Place of birth: Enugu, Nigeria
- Height: 1.94 m (6 ft 4 in)
- Position: Defender

Senior career*
Years	Team	Apps	(Gls)
2005	Polonia Warsaw	9	(0)
2006	HB Køge	2	(0)
2006–2007	→ FC Hjørring (loan)		
2007	Lolland Falster Alliancen	0	(0)
2012	Mqabba FC		
2013–2014	Drukarz Warsaw	9	(0)
- * Club domestic league appearances and goals

Kelvin Ajuluchukwu Igwe (born 26 March 1987) is a Nigerian former professional footballer who played as defender.

== Club career ==
He started career in Polonia Warsaw. He made a debut for this club on 23 September 2005 in away local derby match between Legia Warsaw. He played 9 matches for this club and after that, he moved to HB Køge in January 2006. In Poland, he hasn't been paid for play because he was deceived by manager from Poland. In August 2006 he was loaned to FC Hjørring. He left this club on 23 January 2007 and a week later he was loaned to Lolland-Falster Alliancen. In July 2007 he returned to HB Køge. In March 2008 he suffered knee injury. In autumn 2012 he was a player of Mqabba FC. In 2013, he came back to Poland and he signed Drukarz Warsaw.

== Bibliography ==
- Kelvyn Igwe at 90minut.pl (in Polish)
