= Victor Puiseux =

French mathematician and astronomer

Victor Alexandre Puiseux (French: [viktɔʁ alɛksɑ̃dʁ pɥizø]; 16 April 1820 – 9 September 1883) was a French mathematician and astronomer. Puiseux series are named after him, as is in part the Bertrand–Diquet–Puiseux theorem. His work on algebraic functions and uniformization makes him a direct precursor of Bernhard Riemann, for what concerns the latter's work on this subject and his introduction of Riemann surfaces. He was also an accomplished amateur mountaineer. A peak in the French alps, which he climbed in 1848, is named after him.

A species of gecko, Ptyodactylus puiseuxi, is named in his honor.

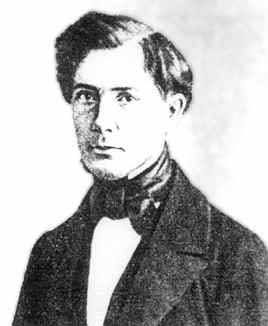
Victor Puiseux.

== Life ==
He was born in 1820 in Argenteuil, Val-d'Oise. He occupied the chair of celestial mechanics at the Sorbonne. Excelling in mathematical analysis, he introduced new methods in his account of algebraic functions, and by his contributions to celestial mechanics advanced knowledge in that direction. In 1871, he was unanimously elected to the French Academy.

One of his sons, Pierre Henri Puiseux, was a famous astronomer.

He died in 1883 in Frontenay, France and was buried in Montparnasse Cemetery.
