= Kelvin (given name) =

Kelvin (/ˈkɛlvɪn/) is a masculine given name, ultimately derived from the title of William Thomson, 1st Baron Kelvin, who received a baronage named for the River Kelvin (the river flowing past the University of Glasgow) in 1892. Isolated use of Kelvin as a given name is recorded in England in the 1920s, and the name rises in popularity in the United States around 1950, according to the authors of the Oxford Dictionary of First Names possibly by association with the similar-sounding Kevin, which surged in popularity at about the same time, and may be further influenced by Calvin and Melvin. In the United States the name peaked in popularity at rank 209 in 1961 and has declined steadily since, dropping to rank 726 as of 2016.

== People with the given name ==
=== In arts and entertainment ===
- Kelvin Fletcher, English actor
- Kelvin Gosnell, British comics editor
- Kelvin Harrison Jr., American actor
- Kelvin Holly, American guitarist
- Kelvin Kwan (born 1983), Canadian-born Hong Kong Cantopop singer
- Kelvin Mercer, American DJ
- Kelvin Sng, Singaporean film director
- Kelvin Tan Wei Lian, Singaporean singer

=== In politics ===
- Kelvin Datcher, American politician
- Kelvin Davis, New Zealand Member of Parliament
- Kelvin Goertzen, Canadian politician
- Kelvin Hopkins, British Labour MP
- Kelvin Lawrence, American politician
- Kelvin Ogilvie, Canadian chemist and senator
- Kelvin Thomson, Australian politician

=== In sports ===
==== Football (soccer) ====
- Kelvin Clarke, English former footballer
- Kelvin Davis, English footballer
- Kelvin Etuhu, Nigerian footballer
- Kelvin Jack, Trinidadian footballer
- Kelvin Langmead, English footballer
- Kelvin Lomax, English footballer
- Kelvin Mateus de Oliveira, Brazilian footballer
- Kelvin Wilson, English footballer

==== American football ====
- Kelvin Anderson, retired American football player
- Kelvin Banks Jr. (born 2004), American football player
- Kelvin Benjamin, American football player
- Kelvin Bryant, American football player
- Kelvin Harmon, American football player
- Kelvin Hayden, American football player
- Kelvin Joseph (born 1999), American football player
- Kelvin Kinney, American football player
- Kelvin Kirk, American football player
- Kelvin Korver, American football player
- Kelvin Smith, American football player

==== Australian rules football ====
- Kelvin Matthews, former Australian rules footballer
- Kelvin Moore, former Australian rules footballer
- Kelvin W. Moore, former Australian rules footballer
- Kelvin Templeton, former Australian rules footballer

==== Basketball ====
- Kelvin Cato, American basketball player
- Kelvin dela Peña, Filipino-Canadian basketball player
- Kelvin Ransey, American basketball player
- Kelvin Sampson, American basketball coach
- Kelvin Scarborough, American basketball player
- Kelvin Upshaw, American basketball player

==== Other sports ====
- Kelvin Batey, English competitive BMX racer
- Kelvin Burt, British auto racing driver
- Kelvin Davis, American boxer
- Kelvin Gastelum, American mixed martial artist
- Kelvin Graham (born 1964), Australian sprint canoeist
- Kelvin Hoefler (born 1994), Brazilian professional street skateboarder
- Kelvin Jiménez, Dominican baseball player
- Kelvin Kiptum, Kenyan long-distance runner
- Kelvin Li (born 1975), Hong Kong freestyle swimmer
- Kelvin Smith (cricketer), Australian cricketer

Article Talk

=== In other fields ===
- Kelvin Droegemeier, American meteorologist and government advisor
- Kelvin Holdsworth, Scottish clergyman
- Kelvin Kent (disambiguation), multiple people
- Kelvin Kong, Australian surgeon
- Kelvin Lancaster, American academic
- Kelvin MacKenzie, British media executive
- Kelvin Malone, American spree killer
- Kelvin Martin, American criminal
- Kelvin Ogilvie, Canadian chemist and senator

== Fictional characters ==
- Kelvin Carpenter, fictional character in the television show EastEnders
- Kelvin Gemstone, fictional character in the television show The Righteous Gemstones
- Kelvin Joe Inman, secondary character on the ABC television drama Lost
