= Pierre Puiseux =

French astronomer (1855–1928)

Pierre Henri Puiseux
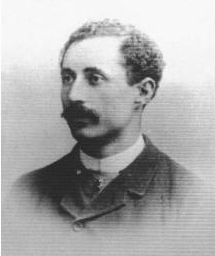
- Born: 20 July 1855; Paris, France
- Died: 28 September 1928 (aged 73)
- Education: École Normale Supérieure (Ph.D, 1879)
- Spouse: Béatrice Laurence Elise Puiseux née Bouvet
- Awards: Valz Prize (1892); Lalande Prize (1896); Prix Jules Janssen (1900)
- Scientific career
- Fields: Astronomy
- Workplaces: Paris Observatory; University of Paris
- Thesis: Sur l'accélération séculaire du mouvement de la lune (1879)

Pierre Henri Puiseux (French: [pɥizø]; 20 July 1855 – 28 September 1928) was a French astronomer.

Born in Paris, son of Victor Puiseux, he was educated at the École Normale Supérieure before starting work as an astronomer at the Paris Observatory in 1885.

He worked on the aberration of light, asteroids, lunar dynamics and, in collaboration with Maurice Loewy, the ill-fated Carte du Ciel project. Puiseux created a photographic atlas of the Moon based on 6000 photographs taken by him and Loewy. In 1892 he was awarded the Valz Prize, and in 1896 was he awarded the Lalande Prize, both from the French Academy of Sciences, which he would later become a member of in 1912.

In 1900, Puiseux received the Prix Jules Janssen, the highest award of the Société astronomique de France (the French astronomical society). He became the Society's president from 1911 to 1913.

The crater Puiseux on the Moon is named after him.

He was a believing and practicing Catholic who died with the sacraments of the Church.

Puiseux at the Fourth Conference International Union for Cooperation in Solar Research at Mount Wilson Observatory
