= Hippalus (crater) =

Crater on the Moon

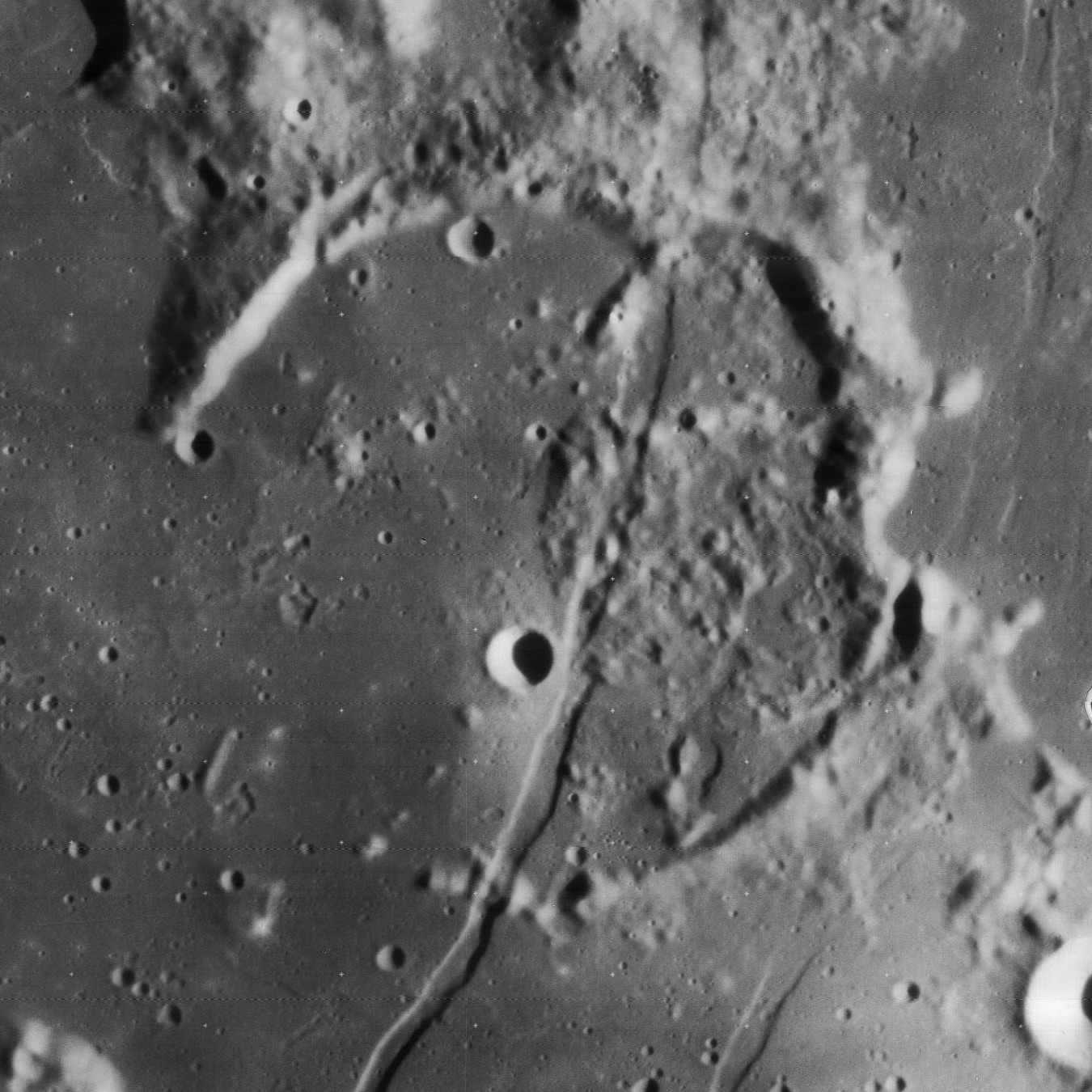
- Lunar Orbiter 4 image
- Coordinates: 24.8°S 30.2°W
- Diameter: 58 km
- Depth: 0.9 km
- Colongitude: 30° at sunrise
- Eponym: Hippalus

Hippalus is the remnant of a lunar impact crater on the eastern edge of Mare Humorum. It was named after ancient Greek explorer Hippalus. To the southeast is the crater Campanus, and to the northwest is the small flooded crater Loewy.

The southwest rim of Hippalus is missing, and the crater forms a bay along the edge of the mare. The surviving rim is worn and eroded, forming a low, circular mountain range. The lava-flooded floor of Hippalus is bisected by a wide rille belonging to the Rimae Hippalus. This rille follows a course to the south before curving gently to the southwest for a total length of 240 kilometers. The crater floor to the east of this rille is more rugged than the area in the western half.

== Satellite craters ==
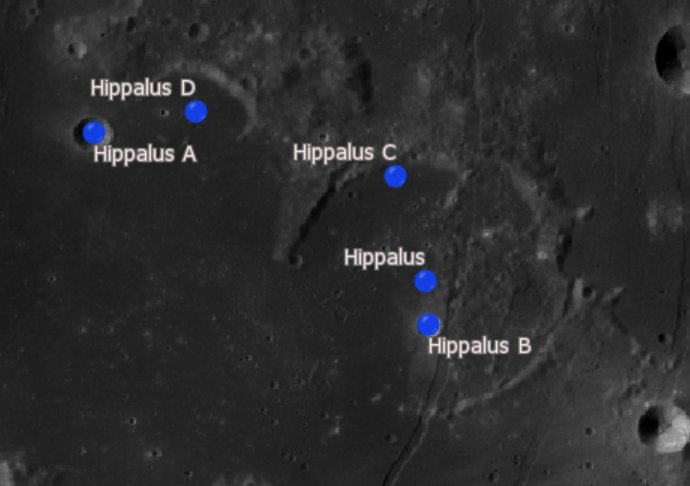
Hippalus and its satellite craters

By convention these features are identified on lunar maps by placing the letter on the side of the crater midpoint that is closest to Hippalus.

Hippalus	Latitude	Longitude	Diameter
A	23.8° S	32.8° W	8 km
B	25.1° S	30.1° W	5 km
C	24.1° S	30.5° W	4 km
D	23.6° S	31.9° W	24 km
