= Kelvin Island (Lake Nipigon) =

Island in Thunder Bay District, Ontario, Canada

- Location within Ontario
- Etymology: Named for William Thomson, 1st Baron Kelvin

Geography
- Location: Lake Nipigon
- Coordinates: 49°51′33″N 88°39′59″W
- Length: 16 km (9.9 mi)
- Width: 11 km (6.8 mi)

Administration
- Canada
- Province: Ontario
- District: Thunder Bay

Kelvin Island (French: île Kelvin) is a large island in the centre of Lake Nipigon, in Thunder Bay District in northwestern Ontario, Canada. It is named after the British scientist William Thomson, 1st Baron Kelvin (1824–1907).

The island has an area of about 10,000 hectares (25,000 acres). Frith Lake lies in the centre of the island, and there are six other unnamed lakes. Henry's Harbour is at the western tip, and Moose's Harbour is the middle on the eastern side.

== Geology ==
Geological mapping of Kelvin Island in the 1980s found it to consist almost entirely of Proterozoic diabase. Cliffs and other outcrops along the shoreline of Kelvin Island expose predominately massive, medium-grained diabase and subordinate layered diabase. Shoreline exposures of quartz, amphibole diabase, poikilitic diabase, and diabase with pegmatitic patches or veins are uncommon. Only a single exposure each of anorthositic diabase and calcareous mudstone was mapped. An exposure of fine-grained, columnar jointed diabase is associated with the exposure of calcareous mudstone.

Regional geological mapping of the northern part of Lake Nipigon region indicates that the diabase underlying Kelvin Island are parts of a single igneous sill approximately 200 meters (660 ft) thick. This sill grades from its base to top in a series of layers consisting of: 1.) a basal lower chill zone, 2.) coarse poikilitic diabase to medium-grained diabase, 3.) medium-grained diabase with coarse pegmatitic patches, and 4.) an upper 2 meters (6.6 ft) of fine-grained to aphanitic diabase with columnar joints and is locally vesicular. The layer of medium-grained diabase locally displays igneous layering and contains zones of anorthosltic diabase. This sill is one of several diabase sills, cone sheets, and dikes, which are collectively known as either the Logan or Nipigon sills, that form extensive rock exposures in the northern part of Lake Nipigon region. These dikes and sills intrude Proterozoic sedimentary rocks, largely quartz arenites and mudstones known as the Sibley Group.

Agates have reportedly been found on the beach along West Bay, which lies on the western shore of Lake Nipigon and west of Kelvin Island. Like the shoreline of Kelvin Island, the shoreline of West Bay consists largely of medium-grained diabase of the Nipigon sills.

== Ecology ==
In 1964 the island had an estimated moose population of 0.48 for each 1 square kilometre (0.39 sq mi) as counted from the air. Pellet group counts may give a higher estimate.

Kelvin Island is part of the Lake Nipigon Conservation Reserve.

== See also ==
- List of things named after Lord Kelvin
