= Gassendi (crater) =

Circular depression on the Moon

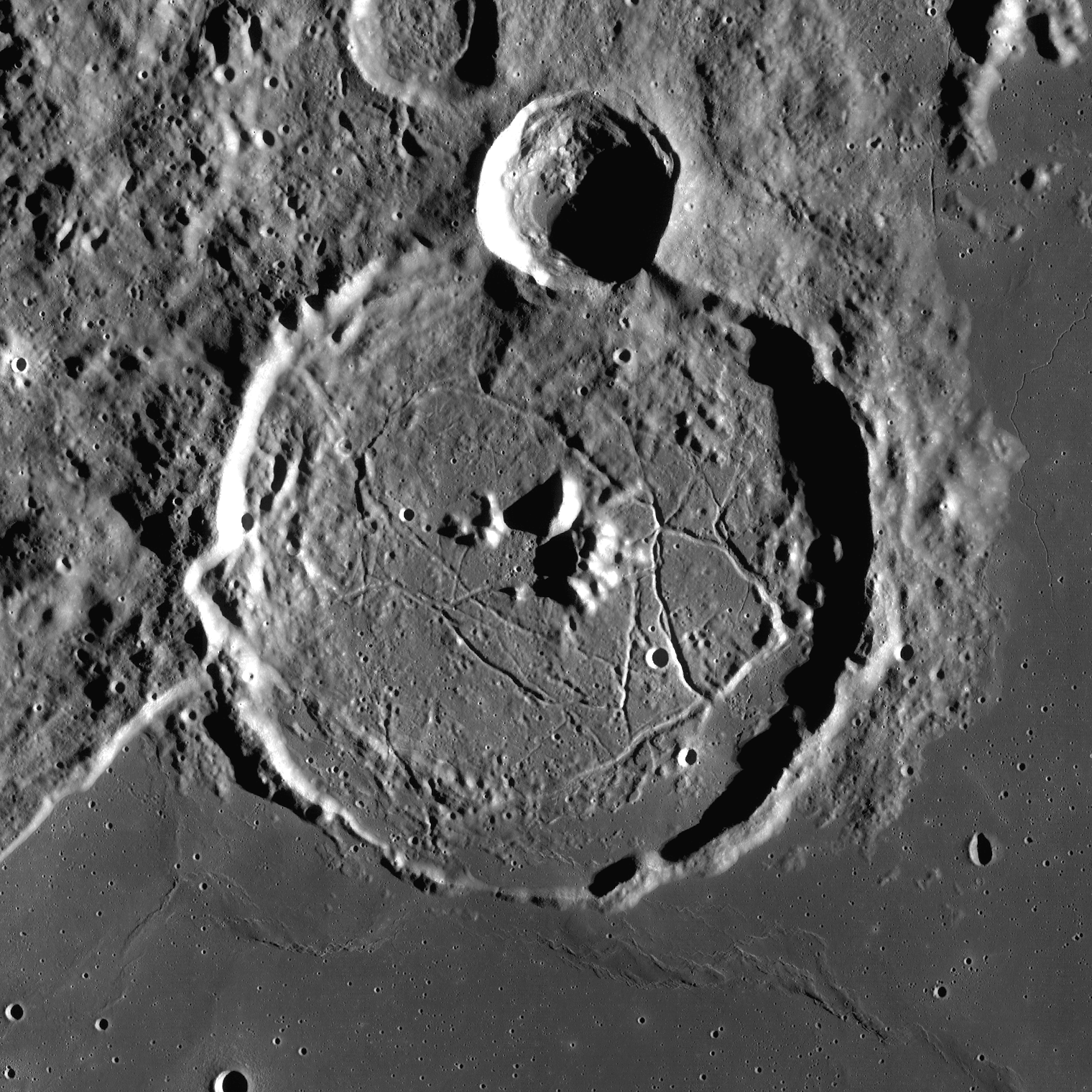
- View of Gassendi from Lunar Reconnaissance Orbiter. NASA photo.
- Coordinates: 17.55°S 39.96°W
- Diameter: 111.39 km (69.21 mi)
- Depth: 1.42 km (0.88 mi)
- Colongitude: 40° at sunrise
- Eponym: Pierre Gassendi

Gassendi is a large lunar impact crater feature located at the northern edge of Mare Humorum. The crater was named after French astronomer Pierre Gassendi by the IAU in 1935. T. W. Webb called this "a conspicuous walled plain", but noted "that its proportions vary considerably according to libration."

On the lunar geologic timescale, Gassendi dates from the Pre-Nectarian period. The formation has been inundated by lava during the formation of the mare, so only the rim and the multiple central peaks remain above the surface. The infrared spectrum of pure crystalline plagioclase has been identified on these mounts. The outer rim is worn and eroded, although it retains a generally circular form. A smaller crater – Gassendi A – intrudes into the northern rim, and joins a rough uplift at the northwest part of the floor. The crater pair bear a curious resemblance to a diamond ring.

In the southern part of the crater floor is a semi-circular ridge-like formation that is concentric with the outer rim. It is in the southern part where the rim dips down to its lowest portion, and a gap appears at the most southern point. The rim varies in height from as little as 200 meters to as high as 2.5 kilometers above the surface. The floor has numerous hummocks and rough spots. There is also a system of fractures that criss-crosses the floor, named the Rimae Gassendi.

The fresh crater Gassendi A is adjacent to Gassendi to the north. Due to its ray system, Gassendi A is mapped as part of the Copernican System. On some older maps, such as the Swiss Hallwag moonmap which was created by Hans Schwarzenbach, the crater Gassendi A was called Clarkson by Hugh Percy Wilkins and Patrick Moore, after the British amateur astronomer and selenographer Roland L. T. Clarkson, but this name is not officially recognized by the IAU and the name has been removed.

Gassendi was considered for a possible landing site during the Apollo program, but was never selected. However, it was imaged at high resolution by Lunar Orbiter 5, for this reason. It was also heavily photographed by Apollo 16.

== Transient lunar phenomena on the floor of Gassendi ==
On april 30 and may 1, 1966, several British observers of the waxing gibbous moon reported transient lunar phenomena in Gassendi. These transient lunar phenomena appeared as red colored glows or patches on the eastern section of Gassendi's floor. One of these patches, the largest one, was reported as a triangle-shaped wedge between the system of central peaks and the eastern part of Gassendi's rim. The apex of the triangle-shaped wedge was located at or near the system of central peaks.

== Satellite craters ==
By convention these features are identified on lunar maps by placing the letter on the side of the crater midpoint that is closest to Gassendi.

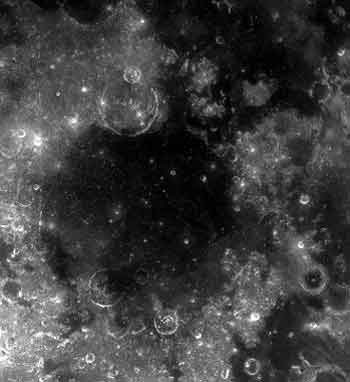
Mare Humorum. The rather large crater to the north of the dark mare is Gassendi. The bright craters west of Gassendi are Gassendi E and Mersenius C.

Gassendi	Coordinates	Diameter, km
A	15.55°S 39.80°W	32
B	14.66°S 40.64°W	25
E	18.45°S 43.63°W	7
F	15.03°S 45.02°W	8
G	16.75°S 44.67°W	7
J	21.62°S 37.10°W	9
K	18.78°S 43.74°W	6
L	20.39°S 41.79°W	5
M	18.61°S 39.15°W	3
N	18.07°S 39.32°W	4
O	21.96°S 35.13°W	10
P	17.29°S 40.75°W	2
R	21.94°S 37.85°W	4
T	19.05°S 35.44°W	10
W	17.66°S 43.73°W	6
Y	20.91°S 38.51°W	5

== Gallery ==
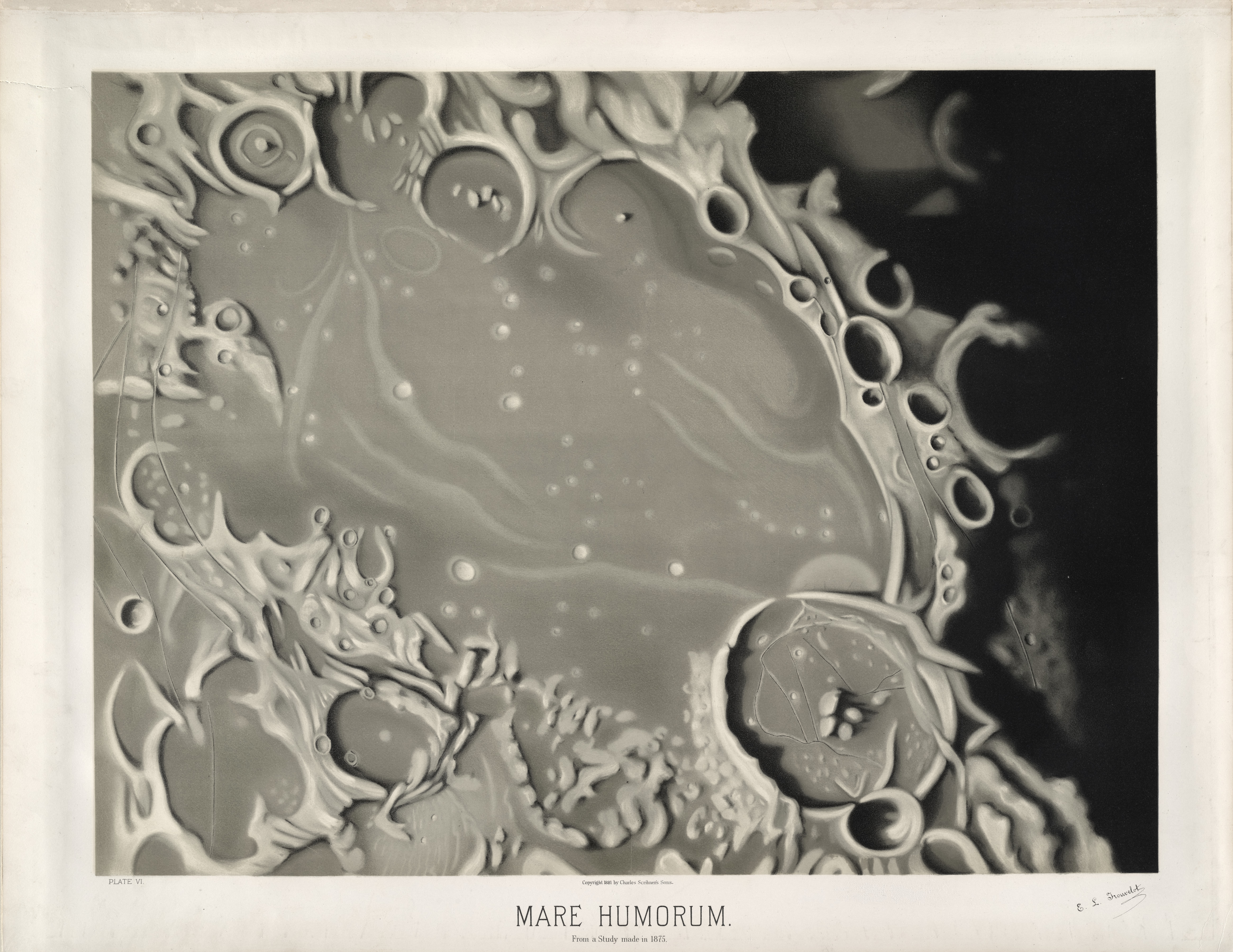
Mare Humorum by Étienne Léopold Trouvelot, 1881

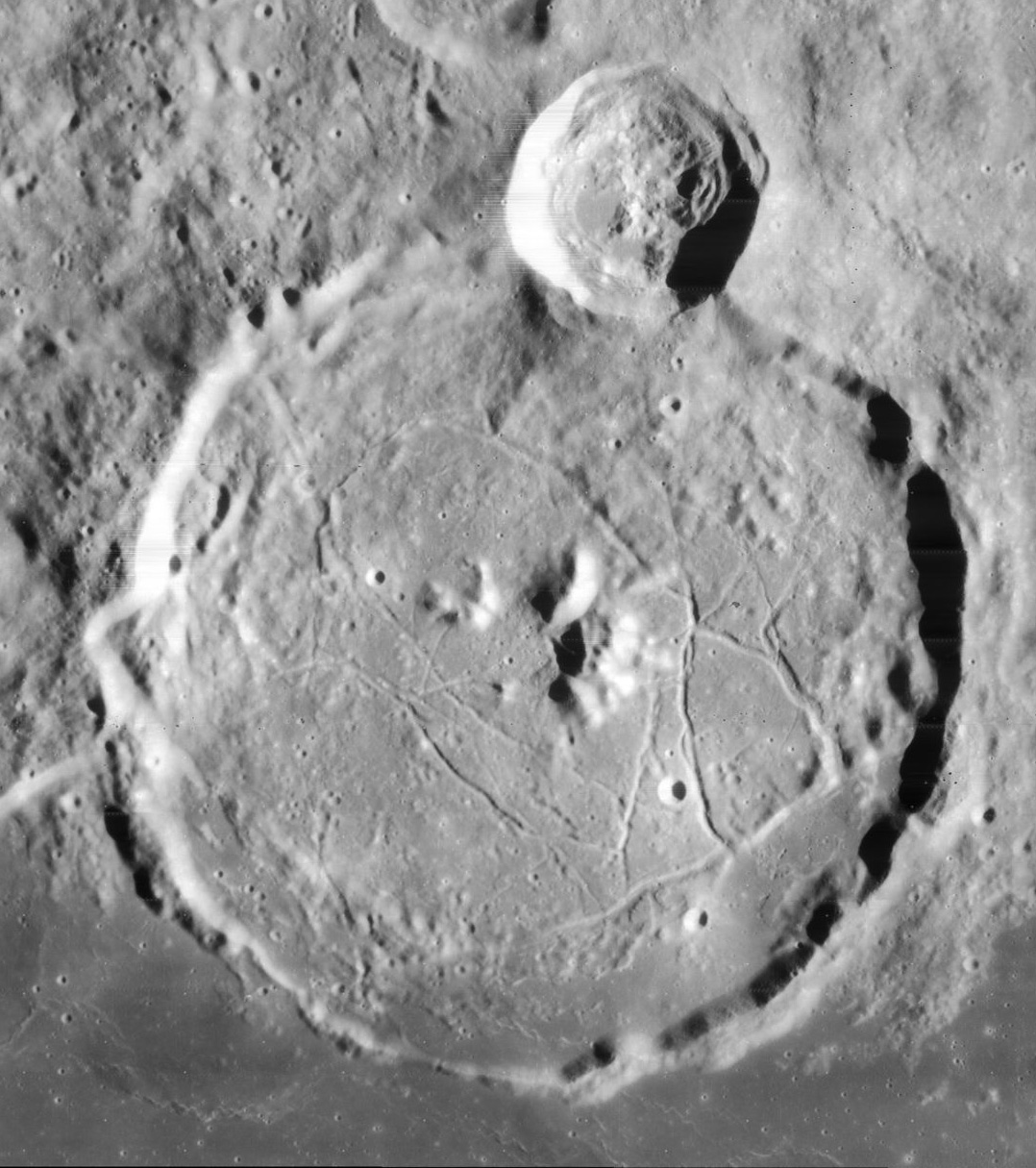
Lunar Orbiter 4 image of Gassendi, with Gassendi A at top

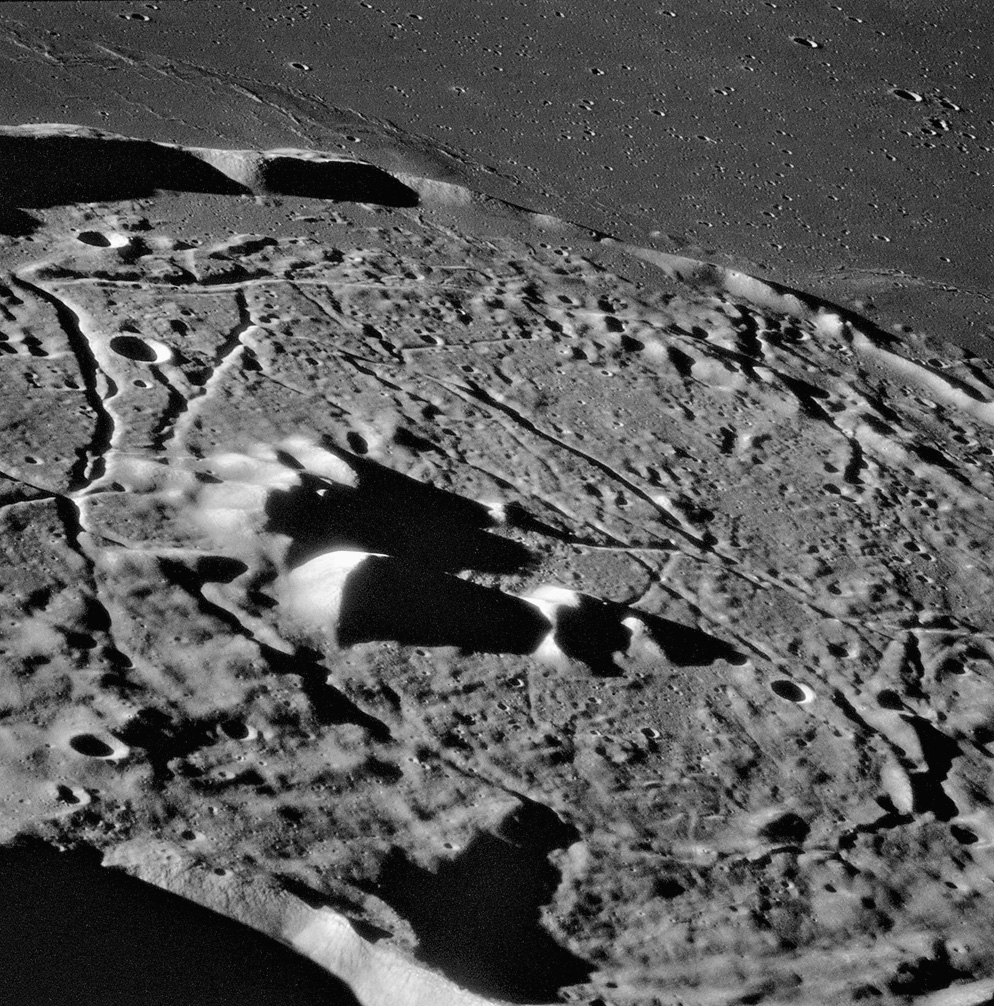
Oblique view of Gassendi from Apollo 16

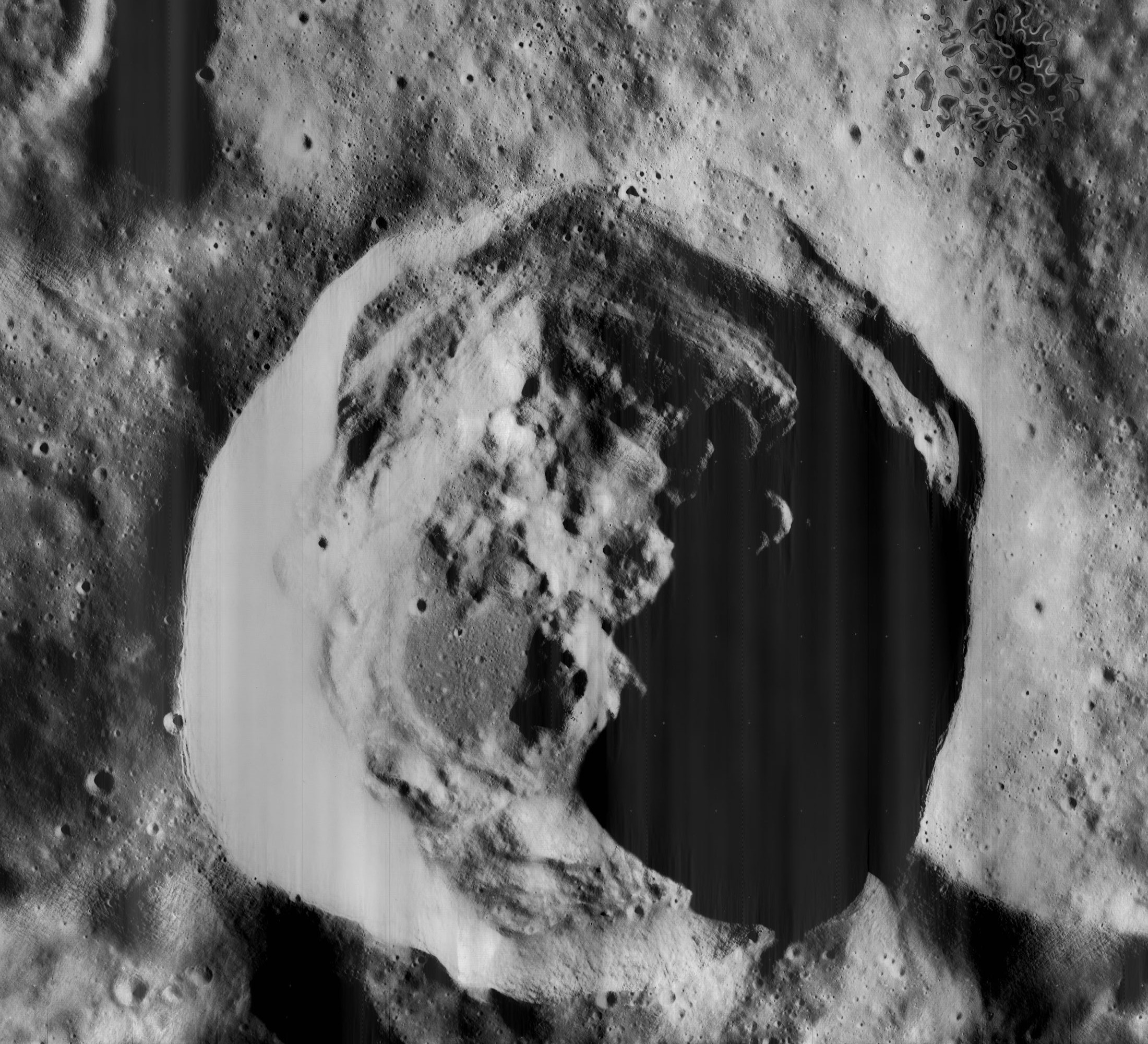
Gassendi A from Lunar Orbiter 5
