= Kelvin, North Dakota =

Unincorporated community in North Dakota, United States

Coordinates: 48°56′14″N 100°03′03″W

Kelvin
- Unincorporated community
- Location within the state of North Dakota
- Country: United States
- State: North Dakota
- County: Rolette
- Founded: 1888
- Named after: William Thomson, 1st Baron Kelvin
- Time zone: UTC-6 (Central (CST))
  - Summer (DST): UTC-5 (CDT)

Kelvin is an unincorporated community in Rolette County, in the U.S. state of North Dakota.

== History ==
Kelvin was laid out in 1888. It was named for William Thomson, 1st Baron Kelvin, a British scientist. A post office called Kelvin was established in 1901, and remained in operation until it was discontinued in 1953.
