= SS Lord Kelvin =

British cable-laying marine vessel

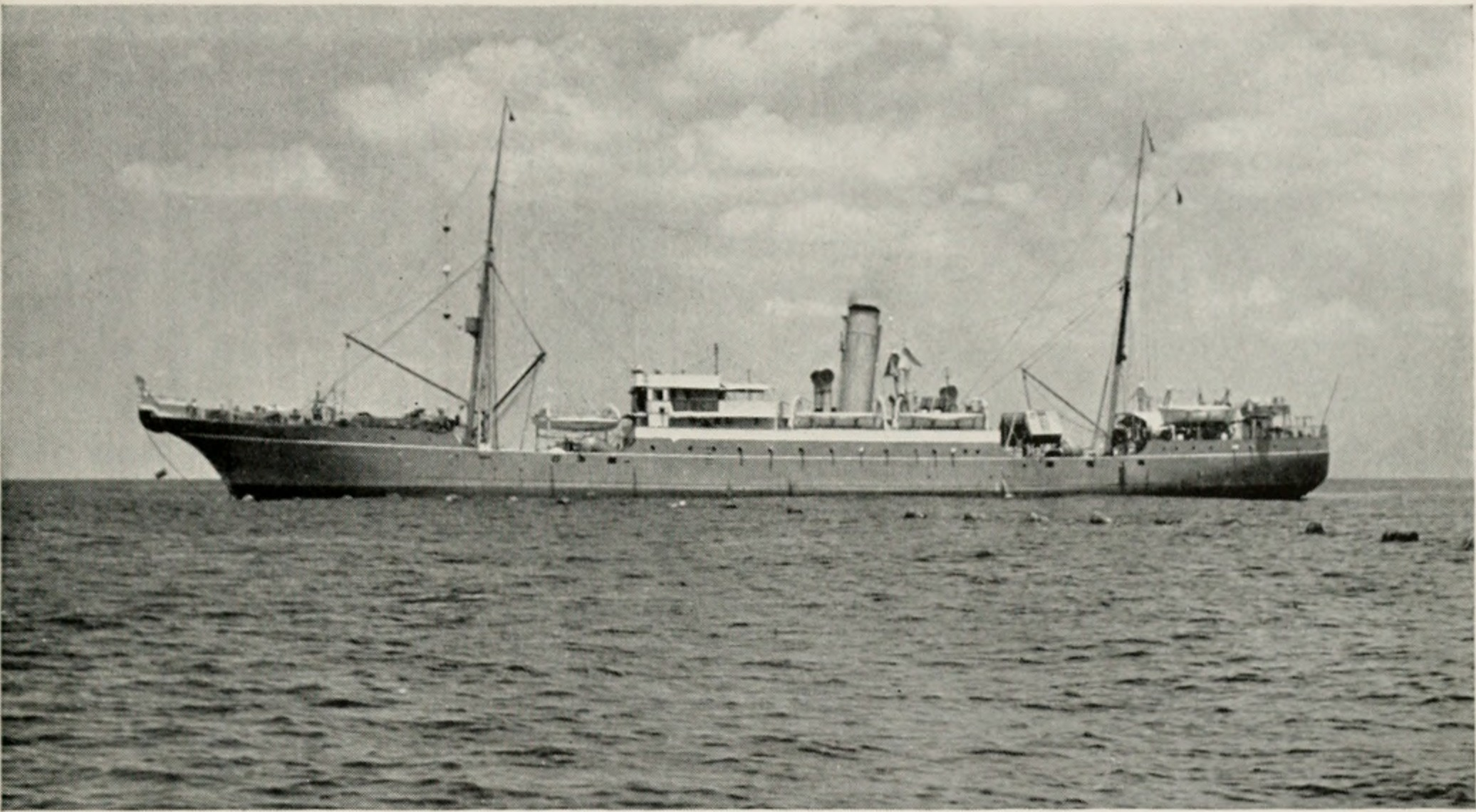
- Lord Kelvin

History
- Name: Lord Kelvin
- Owner: Anglo-American Telegraph Company; Transatlantic Cables Ltd.
- Port of registry: (United Kingdom) London
- Builder: Swan, Hunter and Wigham Richardson Ltd.
- Yard number: 968
- Launched: 27 July 1915
- Completed: March 1916
- Out of service: 1963
- Fate: Scrapped 1967 at La Spezia

General characteristics
- Type: Cable layer
- Tonnage: 2,641 GRT
- Length: 316.6 ft (96.5 m) p.p.
- Beam: 41.2 ft (12.6 m)
- Draught: 22.7 ft (6.9 m)
- Propulsion: 2 x triple expansion engines
- Speed: 11 knots (20 km/h; 13 mph)

The British SS Lord Kelvin was a cable-laying ship which served during the Second World War. Initially owned by the Anglo-American Telegraph Company, Lord Kelvin was completed in 1916. Sold the same year to Transatlantic Cables, the ship spent the rest of her life laying cables until taken out of service in 1963 and broken up in 1967.

== Design and description ==
Lord Kelvin had a gross register tonnage of 2,641 tons. The ship was 316.6 feet (96.5 m) long between perpendiculars, had a beam of 41.2 feet (12.6 m) and a draught of 22.7 feet (6.9 m). The ship was powered by two triple-expansion reciprocating engines driving two shafts, giving the ship a maximum speed of 11 knots (20 km/h; 13 mph).

== Construction and career ==
Ordered from Swan Hunter & Wigham Richardson by the Anglo-American Telegraph Company, Lord Kelvin was constructed at the company's Low Walker yard with the yard number 968, launched on 27 July 1915 and completed in April 1916. Registered in London, the ship was used for light duties for her career. During the Second World War, Lord Kelvin was leased to the Western Telegraph Company. On 27 September 1942, while southwest of Anticosti Island, she was performing cable work when the Canadian Bangor-class minesweeper Chedabucto was ordered to escort her to Rimouski, Quebec. Chedabucto was running in a blacked-out state, and at 05:55, Lord Kelvin rammed the minesweeper in its side, near the wardroom. One member of Chedabucto's crew was killed in the collision.

The collision left a 20-foot (6.1 m) hole in the side of Chedabucto. Most of Chedabucto's crew were transferred to Lord Kelvin as it became apparent that the hole was too big to be patched on the spot. Chedabucto sank while under tow. Lord Kelvin was repaired and resumed service. In 1953 the ship underwent an overhaul at the Telegraph Construction and Maintenance Company, Greenwich. The ship was taken out of service in 1963 and broken up for scrap in 1967 at La Spezia, Italy.
