= Promontorium Kelvin =

Mountain on the Moon

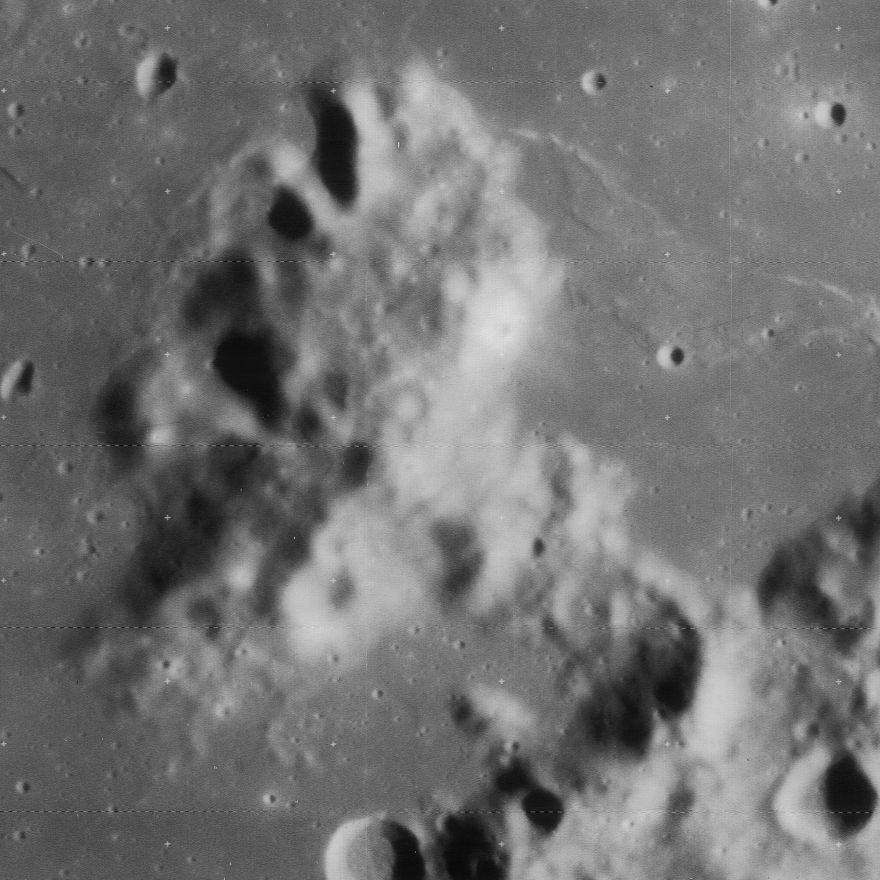
Promonontorium Kelvin, a headland narrowly connected to Rupes Kelvin. Lunar Orbiter 4 photo.

Promontorium Kelvin is a headland on the near side of the Moon. It is located in the southeast of the Mare Humorum. It is close to Rupes Kelvin. Its length is about 45 km. Its coordinates are 26.95°S 33.45°W.

== History ==
The name "Promontorium Kelvin" was approved by the International Astronomical union in 1935, and was assigned the Named Lunar Formation reference number [66] by Mary A. Blagg and K.Müller of Humphries and Co.Ltd. The headland got its name from Lord Kelvin.
