= Mare Humorum =

Lunar surface depression

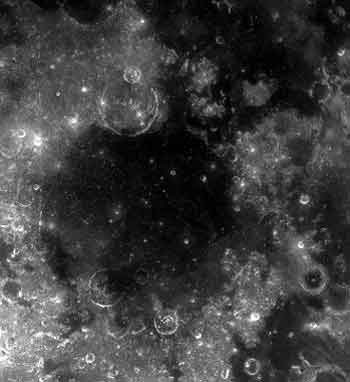
- Mare Humorum. Several connections exist to Oceanus Procellarum to the north. This makes a shape somewhat like a head and shoulders. The rather large crater to the north of the mare is Gassendi. The crater on the southwestern rim of the basin is Doppelmayer. The light grey feature that protrudes into the mare from the southeast is Promontorium Kelvin.
- Coordinates: 24.4°S 38.6°W
- Diameter: 420 km (260 mi)
- Eponym: Sea of Moisture

Mare Humorum /hjuːˈmɔːrəm/ (Latin hūmōrum, the "Sea of Moisture" or "Sea of Humors") is a lunar mare. The impact basin it is located in is 425 kilometers (264 mi) across.

== Geology ==
It was not sampled by the Apollo program, so a precise age has not been determined. However, geological mapping indicates that it is intermediate in age between the Imbrium and Nectaris Basins, suggesting an age of about 3.9 billion years. The Humorum basin is filled with a thick layer of mare basalt, believed to exceed 3 kilometers in thickness at the center of the basin.

A mass concentration (mascon), or gravitational high, was identified in the center of Mare Humorum from Doppler tracking of the five Lunar Orbiter spacecraft in 1968. The mascon was confirmed and mapped at higher resolution with later orbiters such as Lunar Prospector and GRAIL.

On the north edge of Mare Humorum is the large crater Gassendi, which was considered as a possible landing site for Apollo 17. To the south are the floor-fractured Vitello crater, the partially flooded Doppelmayer, and the smaller Puiseux. To the east are Hippalus crater and Promontorium Kelvin. To the west are the Rimae Doppelmayer and the Rupes Liebig, which are cliffs near Liebig itself which is just west of the mare.

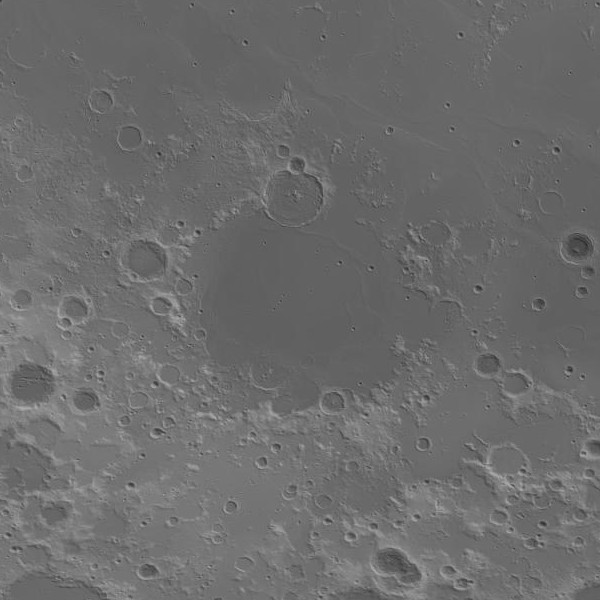
Satellite image

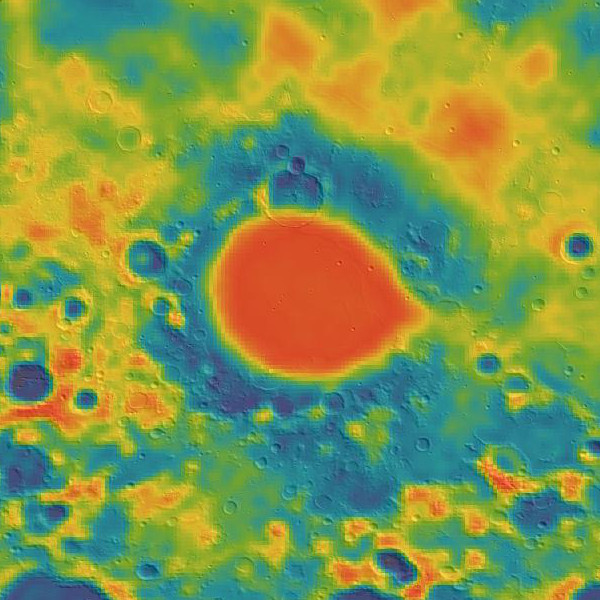
Gravity map based on GRAIL

== Names ==
Like most of the other maria on the Moon, Mare Humorum was named by Giovanni Riccioli, whose 1651 nomenclature system has become standardized. Previously, the 17th century astronomer Pierre Gassendi had named it Anticaspia ('opposite to the Caspian', referring to Mare Crisium, which he had named after the Caspian Sea), and Michael van Langren had labelled it the Mare Venetum ("Venetian Sea") in his 1645 map. Johannes Hevelius called it Sinus Sirbonis ("Bay of Serbonis", after the lake of Serbonis, now Lake Bardawil, in Egypt) in his 1647 map.

== See also ==
- Volcanism on the Moon
