= Rupes Kelvin =

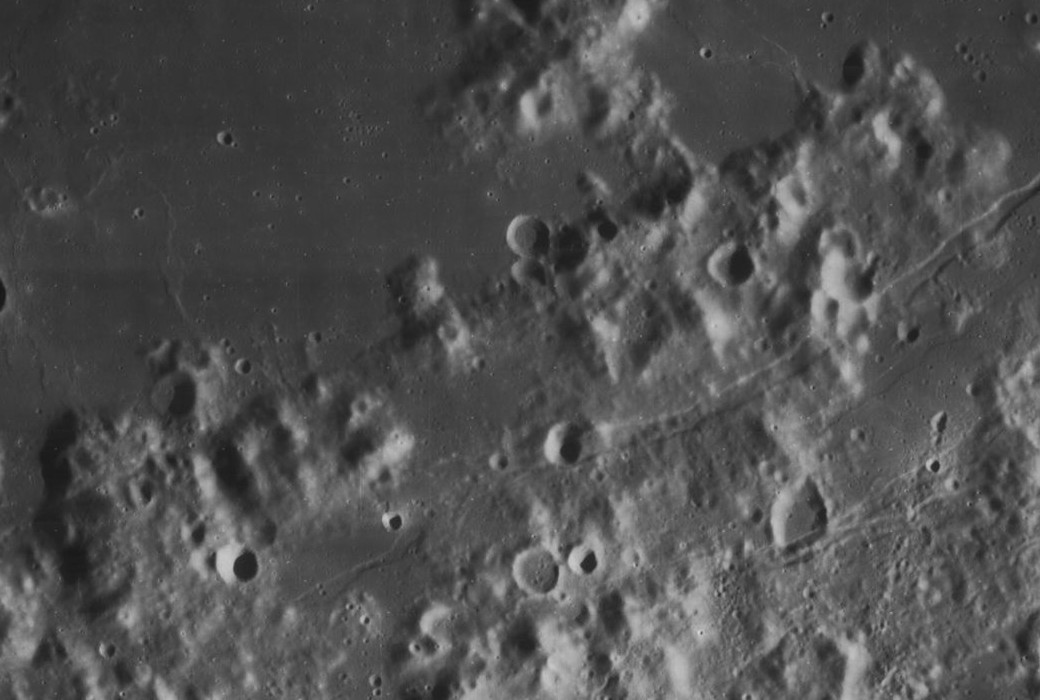
Rupes Kelvin, taken by Lunar Orbiter 4

Rupes Kelvin is an escarpment near Promontorium Kelvin on the near side of the Moon, at 27.3°S 33.1°W.

It is 86 km long. It takes its name from Promontorium Kelvin, which was named after the Irish scientist, physicist and engineer William Thomson, 1st Baron Kelvin.
