= Burton (name) =

Origin
- Meaning: "A town in Staffordshire" (Location)
- Region of origin: England

Burton is an English surname with habitational origins.

== People surnamed Burton ==
- Abraham Burton (born 1971), American saxophonist and bandleader
- Adam Burton (baseball) (1972–2025), Australian baseball player
- Alexander Burton (1893–1915), Australian recipient of the Victoria Cross
- Alfred Edgar Burton (1857–1935), American academic, first Dean of the Faculty of MIT
- Alfred Henry Burton (c. 1834 – 1914), New Zealand photographer
- Alison Burton (1921–2014), Australian tennis player
- Amanda Burton (born 1957), Northern Irish actress
- Amanda Burton (born 1980), Australian netball player
- Andrew Burton (disambiguation), multiple people
- Aron Burton (1938–2016), American blues singer, bass guitarist and songwriter
- Arthur Burton (c. 1889 – death unknown), rugby league footballer who played in the 1900s, 1910s and 1920s
- Baron Burton is a peerage title created in 1886 and 1887 in the Peerage of the United Kingdom
- Beryl Burton (1937–1996), English racing cyclist
- Beverly Chester-Burton (born 1963), American politician
- Bob Burton Jr. (born 1985), American speedcuber
- Brandie Burton (born 1972), American professional golfer
- Brett Burton (born 1978), Australian rules footballer
- Brian Burton, better known as Danger Mouse (born 1977), American producer and disc jockey
- Charles Burton (disambiguation), multiple people
- Charlotte Burton (1881–1942), American silent film actress
- Clarence Burton (disambiguation), multiple people
- Cliff Burton (1962–1986), Metallica bassist
- Corey Burton (born 1955), American voice actor
- Dan Burton (born 1938), U.S. Congressman
- Daniel Burton (born 1963), American cyclist, Antarctica Cycling Expeditions
- Decimus Burton (1800–1881), English architect and garden designer
- Deon Burton (born 1976), English-Jamaican footballer
- Deonte Burton (born 1991), American basketball player
- Dick Burton (golfer) (1907–1874), British golfer
- Edmund Burton (footballer) (1893–1916), English footballer
- Elizabeth Eaton Burton (1869–1937), American artist
- Ellis Burton (1936–2013), American baseball player
- Ernie Burton (1921–1999), English professional footballer
- Ethel Burton, American comedic film actress
- Francis Burton (disambiguation), multiple people
- Frederick Burton (disambiguation)
- Gary Burton (born 1943), American jazz vibraphone player
- George Burton (disambiguation)
- Gustav Burton (born 2002), British racing driver
- Hal B. Burton, American politician
- Hana Burton (born 1997), American racing driver
- Harold Hitz Burton (1888–1964), American politician and Supreme Court Justice
- Harrison Burton (born 2000), American racing driver
- Harry Burton (Egyptologist), British egyptologist
- Harry Burton (journalist) (1968–2001), Australian journalist
- Henry Burton (Conservative politician) (1876–1947), British Conservative MP for Sudbury 1924–1945
- Henry Burton (physician) (1799–1849), English physician
- Henry Burton (theologian) (1578–1648), English puritan
- Henry Burton-Peters (1792–1875), Whig MP for Beverley (UK Parliament constituency) 1830–1837
- Henry Burton Buckley, 1st Baron Wrenbury, British barrister and judge
- Hilarie Burton (born 1982), American actress
- Sir Humphrey Burton (1931–2025), British classical music presenter, broadcaster, director, producer and biographer of musicians
- Hutchins Gordon Burton (1774–1832), American politician
- Jager Burton (born 2002), American football player
- Jake Burton Carpenter (1954–2019), American snowboarder
- James Burton (disambiguation)
- Janet Burton, British academic
- Jared Burton (born 1981), American baseball player
- Jeb Burton (born 1992), American stock car racing driver
- Jeff Burton (born 1967), American stock car racing driver
- Jenny Burton (born 1957), American rhythm and blues singer
- Jermaine Burton (born 2001), American football player
- Joan Burton (born 1949), Irish politician
- John Burton (disambiguation)
- Kate Burton (disambiguation)
- Katherine Burton (1890–1969), American social activist and Catholic convert
- Ken Burton (born 1970), British chorist, composer and recording artist
- Konni Burton (born 1963), American politician
- Kris Burton (born 1980), Australia-born Italian rugby player
- Lance Burton (born 1960), American stage magician
- Leonard Burton (born 1964), American football player
- Leonard Samuel Burton (1824–1895), educator and mayor in Gawler, South Australia
- LeVar Burton (born 1957), American actor and game show host
- Lewis Burton (born 1992), British tennis player and model
- Lori Burton (1940–2021), American singer and songwriter
- Margaret E. Burton, American missionary to China and Japan
- Marion LeRoy Burton (1874–1925), American scholar
- Mark Burton (disambiguation), multiple people
- Maurice Burton (1898–1992), English zoologist and author
- Maurice Burton (cyclist) (born 1955), English cyclist
- Michael Burton (born 1992), American football player
- Montague Burton (1885–1952), founder of Burton clothes shops
- Nancy Jane Burton (1891–1972), Scottish artist
- Norman Burton, American actor
- Oliver Burton, English footballer
- Ollie Burton, Welsh international footballer
- Patricia Burton, All-American Girls Professional Baseball League player
- Peter Burton, British actor
- Phillip Burton, American politician
- Ralph Burton (disambiguation), multiple people
- Raymond S. Burton, American politician
- Reginald George Burton (1864–1951), British Indian army officer, sportsman, military historian
- Richard Burton (1925–1984), Welsh actor
- Richard Burton (comics), British comic editor
- Richard Francis Burton (1821–1890), British explorer, translator, orientalist
- Richard Henry Burton (1923–1993), English recipient of the Victoria Cross
- Rob Burton, Mayor of Oakville, Ontario, Canada
- Robert Burton (1577–1640), English scholar, cleric and author
- Robert Burton (American politician) (1747–1825), North Carolina delegate to Continental Congress
- Roderick Burton, better known as Dolla (1987–2009), American rapper
- Ron Burton (1936–2003), American football player
- Ryan Burton (born 1997), Australian footballer
- Ryan Burton (born 1997), American YouTuber of Loveliveserve
- Sala Burton, American politician
- Sam Burton (1926–2020), English footballer
- Samuel Burton (disambiguation)
- Sarah Burton (disappeared 2018), American missing woman
- Sarah Burton, creative director of Alexander McQueen
- Steve Burton (disambiguation)
- Terry Burton, English football manager
- Terry C. Burton, American politician
- Theodore E. Burton (1851–1929), American politician
- Theodore M. Burton (1907–1989), LDS General Authority
- Thomas Burton (died 1496 or 1495), Loughborough, England, wool merchant
- Thomas Burton (died 1661), British Member of Parliament for Westmorland, 1656–1659
- T. L. Burton, professor of medieval English literature at the University of Adelaide
- Tom Burton, American professional wrestler
- Thomas Burton Adams Jr., commonly known as Tom Burton
- Thomas Burton Hanly (1812–1880), Confederate politician
- Tim Burton (born 1958), American film director
- Tim Burton (musician) (born 1963), American saxophonist
- Tommie Burton (1878–1946), West Indian cricketer
- Tony Burton (1937–2016), U.S. actor, comedian, boxer, and football player
- Trey Burton (born 1991), American football player
- Trevor Burton (born 1944), English guitarist
- Tyler Burton (born 2000), American basketball player
- Veronica Burton (born 2000), American basketball player
- Virginia Lee Burton (1909–1968), American illustrator and children's book author
- Walter John Burton, New Zealand photographer
- Ward Burton (born 1961), American stock car racing driver
- Wes Burton (born 1980), American racing driver
- William Burton (disambiguation)

== Given name ==
- Burton Bailey, Canadian politician
- Burton Barr (1917–1997), American politician from Arizona
- Burton Cummings (born 1947), Canadian musician
- Burton E. Green (1868–1965), American oilman and co-founder of Beverly Hills, California
- Burton Hecht (born 1927), New York politician and judge
- Burton Hersh, American author, journalist and commentator
- Burt Lancaster (1913–1994), American actor
- Burton Lifland (1929–2014), American federal bankruptcy judge
- Burt Reynolds (1936–2018), American actor, producer and stuntman

== Other ==
- Janne "Burton" Puurtinen (born 1974), Finnish musician

== Fictional characters ==
- Burton Guster, from the television series Psych
- Burton Wayne, from the novel To a God Unknown, by John Steinbeck
- Jack Burton, from Big Trouble in Little China
- Madlax characters:
  - Richard Burton
  - Margaret Burton (Madlax)
- Barry Burton, from Resident Evil
- Colonel Burton, character in the strategy game Command & Conquer: Generals
- "Big Guy" Bill Burton, one of Hao's followers in the manga and anime series Shaman King
- Burton Phillips, from Hollyoaks in the City
- Mel Burton from Hollyoaks, Sophie's twin
- Sophie Burton from Hollyoaks, Mel's twin
- Justin Burton from Hollyoaks, Sophie and Mel's younger brother

== See also ==
- Burton (disambiguation)
