= Girl Porters =

The Girl Porters (1917-1919) were the first women employed by the UK House of Commons other than in housekeeping, cleaning and catering roles.

== History ==
Women in the First World War undertook many civilian jobs for the first time across the world. In the House of Commons, male porters were employed by the Serjeant at Arms department before the war to deliver letters, messages and other items between offices. After the war broke out, the male porters either volunteered or were conscripted for military service, until there was such a shortage that the House of Commons had to employ women.

Four young women aged between 14 and 18 were employed as 'Girl Porters' by the Assistant Serjeant at Arms, Walter H Erskine. He was very worried about this and wrote to the speaker of the House of Commons, James Lowther, to warn him about this innovation. He also wrote to heads of Commons Offices to ask that their staff take a greater share in carrying heavy boxes and books. But by the end of the war, Erskine was completely satisfied with their work. He gave them excellent references and wrote to the War Office that 'It is impossible for me to speak too highly of the way these girls have done their work while at the House of Commons.'

The House of Commons Girl Porters were employed on the same terms as Girl Messengers at the government War Office, and wore the same uniforms, brown drill overalls and hats. They were employed from April 1917 to March 1919, when the male porters were demobilised from the armed forces and began to return to their jobs, apart from the youngest, Mabel Clark, who died in November 1918 from the flu pandemic.

The Girl Porters are significant as examples of female labour substituting for male labour for the first time during the First World War, and as the first women directly employed by the House of Commons administration apart from in cleaning and catering roles. Although women had begun to work in secretarial and typing roles in offices in Parliament by this date, they were contractors employed by Ashworth & Co or directly by MPs.

Women were next employed as porters by the House of Commons when shortages of men occurred during the Second World War.

== The Girl Porters ==
The four Girl Porters were:

- Elsie Rose Clark (1900-1975), later married name Balch, aged 16 when employed by the House of Commons
- Mabel Edith Clark (1902-1918), aged 14
- Dorothy Gladys Hart (1898-1980), later married name Haddock, aged 18
- Veronica (known as Vera) Agnes Goldsmith (1900-1950), aged 16

Elsie and Mabel Clark were sisters, two of seven children of John, a police constable who died in 1914, and Olive. Their older brother Alfred was killed at the Battle of the Somme; three younger siblings lived at the Metropolitan & City Police Orphanage. They were nieces of 'Porter Clark', Samuel Clark, who worked in the House of Commons from 1898 to 1939.

Hart and Goldsmith both worked in dressmaking before the war and then became War Office Girl Messengers before coming to work in the House of Commons. After the war, Hart returned to dressmaking, working for fashion designer Madame Isobel before marrying. Goldsmith hoped to join the London Chamber of Commerce but ended up working in retail.

== See also ==
- May Court, House of Lords Accountant
- Jane Julia Bennett, House of Lords Housekeeper
- Elizabeth Favill, head cook and manager of Bellamy's
