= Elizabeth Burton =

Elizabeth Burton is the name of:

- Liz Burton, character in Hollyoaks
- Elizabeth Taylor, actress (1932–2011), married name Burton
- Lizzie Burton, character in EastEnders
- Alice Elizabeth Burton (1908–1952), novelist and popular historian
- Elizabeth Eaton Burton (1869–1937), American artist and designer
- Elizabeth Favill (1795-1864), married name Burton, chief cook of Bellamy's Refreshment Rooms

== See also ==
- Burton (name)
