= 1892–93 Aston Villa F.C. season =

English football club season

Aston Villa
- Manager: George Ramsay
- Ground: Wellington Road
- Football League: 4th
- FA Cup: first round
Home colours	Away colours	Third colours

First Division
- Champions: Sunderland, 2nd title
- Relegated: Notts County
- Top goalscorer: 31 J Campbell, Sunderland
- Biggest home win: Newton Heath 10–1 Wolves (15 October 1892)
- Biggest away win: Accrington 0–6 Sunderland (3 September 1892)
- Longest winning run: 8 matches Everton
- Longest unbeaten run: 10 matches Sunderland
- Longest losing run: 7 matches The Wednesday
- Highest attendance: 27,500,Everton 6–0 Preston (11 February 1893)

The 1892–93 English football season was Aston Villa's 5th season in the Football League. The season fell in what was to be called Villa's golden era. This season saw the introduction of the Second Division below the now First Division clubs.

George Ramsay would continue in charge of Aston Villa while the Management Committee continued to pick the team. Frederick Rinder had become the club's financial secretary in 1892, and set about installing turnstiles at Villa's Wellington Road, Perry Barr ground. Gate receipts immediately increased from £75 to £250. He introduced many other good business practices to the club. It was his idea to make Aston Villa a limited company. Rinder would later be known as the 'Grand Old Man of Aston Villa'.

First-class cricketer and England football international, Jack Devey was Captain. Denny Hodgetts also captained the team. There were debut appearances for Bill Dunning (64), Bob Chatt, Jack Ramsay, Peter Dowds, Jock Fleming, George A Davis, Jimmy Logan, Fred Burton, Bob Roberts, David Skea, William Devey, Albert Woolley and Arthur Stokes (13).

As late as 1901, in the warm weather months, Villa would forgo their heavier woollen club colours in favour of thin cotton red shirts.

== First Division ==
Pos	Team	Pld	W	D	L	GF	GA	GAv	Pts
2	Preston North End	30	17	3	10	57	39	1.462	37
3	Everton	30	16	4	10	74	51	1.451	36
4	Aston Villa	30	16	3	11	73	62	1.177	35
5	Bolton Wanderers	30	13	6	11	56	55	1.018	32
6	Burnley	30	13	4	13	51	44	1.159	30

Source: World Football
Rules for classification: 1) Points; 2) Goal average; 3) Goals scored

5 September 1892	Burnley	0–2	Aston Villa	Turf Moor
		Report	Lewis Campbell; Jock Fleming

10 September 1892	Aston Villa	4–1	Everton	Wellington Road
	Dennis Hodgetts; Jock Fleming (2); Jack Devey	Report

12 September 1892	Stoke	1–0	Aston Villa	Victoria Ground
	Lewis Campbell	Report

17 September 1892	Aston Villa	1–6	Sunderland	Wellington Road
	Dennis Hodgetts	Report

19 September 1892	West Bromwich Albion	3–2	Aston Villa	Stoney Lane
		Report	Jack Devey; George Davis
Note: George A. Davis scores in his only appearance for Villa. Having arrived from Aston Manor, he moves on to Smethwick Centaur

24 September 1892	Bolton Wanderers	5–0	Aston Villa	Pike's Lane
		Report

1 October 1892	Everton	1–0	Aston Villa	Goodison Park
		Report

8 October 1892	Wolverhampton Wanderers	2–1	Aston Villa	Molineux
		Report	Dennis Hodgetts

10 October 1892	Aston Villa	3–2	Stoke	Wellington Road
	Albert Brown; Lewis Campbell; Jack Devey	Report

15 October 1892	Aston Villa	1–0	Nottingham Forest	Wellington Road
	Albert Brown	Report

22 October 1892	Preston North End	4–1	Aston Villa	Deepdale
		Report	Albert Brown

29 October 1892	Aston Villa	6–1	Derby County	Wellington Road
	Albert Brown; Charlie Athersmith (2); Jimmy Cowan; Jack Devey; Unknown	Report

5 November 1892	Aston Villa	5–2	West Bromwich Albion	Wellington Road
	Albert Brown (2); Charlie Hare; Jack Devey; Fred Burton	Report

12 November 1892	Nottingham Forest	4–5	Aston Villa	New Town Ground
		Report	Charlie Athersmith (3); Dennis Hodgetts; Jack Devey

19 November 1892	Newton Heath	2–0	Aston Villa	North Road
		Report

26 November 1892	Aston Villa	3–1	Preston North End	Wellington Road
	Dennis Hodgetts; Albert Brown; Peter Dowds	Report

3 December 1892	Sheffield Wednesday	5–3	Aston Villa	Olive Grove
		Report	Peter Dowds; Jack Devey (2)

10 December 1892	Aston Villa	4–1	Blackburn Rovers	Wellington Road
	Charlie Athersmith; Jack Devey; Albert Brown	Report

17 December 1892	Derby County	2–1	Aston Villa	Racecourse Ground
		Report	Jimmy Logan

24 December 1892	Aston Villa	1–1	Bolton Wanderers	Wellington Road
	Jack Devey	Report

31 December 1892	Notts County	1–4	Aston Villa	Trent Bridge
		Report	Charlie Athersmith (2); Jack Devey; David Skea

7 January 1893	Aston Villa	5–1	Sheffield Wednesday	Wellington Road
	Jimmy Logan (2); Dennis Hodgetts; William Devey	Report

14 January 1893	Sunderland	6–0	Aston Villa	Newcastle Road
		Report

11 February 1893	Blackburn Rovers	2–2	Aston Villa	Ewood Park
		Report	Charlie Athersmith

6 March 1893	Aston Villa	2–0	Newton Heath	Wellington Road
	Jimmy Logan	Report

18 March 1893	Aston Villa	3–1	Notts County	Wellington Road
	Fred Burton; Jack Devey (2)	Report

25 March 1893	Aston Villa	6–4	Accrington	Wellington Road
	Jack Devey (2); Albert Brown; Albert Woolley (2); Charlie Athersmith	Report

3 April 1893	Aston Villa	5–0	Wolverhampton Wanderers	Wellington Road
	Dennis Hodgetts; Jack Devey; Albert Woolley (2); Albert Brown	Report

4 April 1893	Aston Villa	1–3	Burnley	Wellington Road
	Jack Devey	Report

15 April 1893	Accrington	1–1	Aston Villa	Thorneyholme Road
		Report	Jack Devey

Source: avfchistory.co.uk

== FA Cup ==
First round

Tie No.	Home team	Score	Away team	Date
2	Darwen	5–4	Aston Villa	21 January 1893

== Birmingham Cup ==
Burslem Port Vale were eliminated in the Second Round of the Birmingham Senior Cup by Aston Villa.

== Friendlies ==
14 November 1892 Friendly	Aston Villa	2–3	Liverpool	Perry Barr
	Campbell; Davis	Report	McVean; Miller; McQueen	Stadium: Liverpool; Attendance: 3,000; Referee: Mr. Ford

9 March 1893 Friendly	Liverpool	1–3	Aston Villa	Liverpool
	McQueen 15'	Report	Skea	Stadium: Anfield; Attendance: 2,000

== Reserves ==
Reserve sides of Aston Villa had played unofficial matches since the formation of the club in 1874, while formal competition for a reserve side began in 1892, when Aston Villa Reserves joined the Birmingham & District League. They were runners-up, losing out on goal average.
