= Catherine Burton =

Catherine Burton may refer to:

- Katherine Burton, religious biographer and social activist
- Cathy Burton, fictional character in novel, This Can't Be Happening at Macdonald Hall
- Catharine Burton, nun

== See also ==
- Kate Burton (disambiguation)
- Burton (surname)
