= Robert Burton (disambiguation) =

Robert Burton (1577–1640) was an English writer and fellow of Oxford University, best known for his encyclopedic book The Anatomy of Melancholy.

Robert Burton may also refer to:

== Sports ==
- Robert Burton (athlete) (1885–1950), British track and field athlete
- Bob Burton (basketball) (born 1945), American basketball coach
- Claude Burton (1891–1971), cricketer, full name Robert Claude Burton
- Robert Burton (cricketer, born 1943), Trinidadian-born former English cricketer
- Robbie Burton (footballer) (born 1999)

== Politicians ==
- Robert Burton (MP), member of parliament for Great Grimsby 1380–1397
- Robert Burton (American politician) (1747–1825), North Carolina politician and American Revolution officer
- Robert Burton-Chadwick (1869–1951), English shipping magnate and politician
- Rob Burton, Canadian mayor

== Others ==
- Robert Burton (academic), master of University College, Oxford, England (1420–1423/4)
- Bob Burton Jr. (born 1985), American speedcuber
- Robert Burton (actor) (1895–1962), American film and television actor
- Robert A. Burton, American physician, novelist, nonfiction author and columnist
- Robert T. Burton (1821–1907), Canadian religious leader
- Robert Burton, pseudonym of Nathaniel Crouch (c. 1640–1725?), English writer
- Robbie Burton (publisher)

== See also ==
- Burton (name)
