= Charles Burton =

Charles Burton may refer to:

- Charles Burton (cricketer) (1875–1948), Jamaican cricketer
- Charles Burton (journalist), English journalist and sportswriter
- Charles Burton (judge) (1760–1847), English born barrister and judge in Ireland
- Charles Burton (sinologist), Canadian political scientist.
- Charles Burton (theologian) (1793–1866), English clergyman and writer
- Charles Burton (wrestler) (born 1973), American Olympic wrestler
- Charles E. Burton (1846–1882), Irish astronomer
- Charles E. Burton (politician), American politician in Arizona
- Charles G. Burton (1846–1926), U.S. representative from Missouri
- Charles Lee Burton (born 1950), American convicted murderer
- Charles Pierce Burton (1862–1949), newspaper columnist and author
- Charles R. Burton (1942–2002), explorer and member of Transglobe Expedition
- Sir Charles Burton, 1st Baronet (1702–1775), Anglo-Irish politician
- Woody Burton (Charles Burton, born 1945), member of the Indiana House of Representatives

== See also ==
- Charlie Burton (disambiguation)
- Charles Barton (disambiguation)
- Charles Burton Barber (1845–1894), English painter
- Burton baronets, several of whom were named Charles Burton
- Burton (name)
