= Mary Ashworth =

Mary Ashworth may refer to:

- Mary Wells Ashworth (1903–1992), American historian
- Mary Howard Ashworth (1863–1928), English businesswoman
