= Margaret Burton =

Margaret or Maggie Burton may refer to:

- Margaret Burton (actress) (1924–1984), English actress
- Margaret E. Burton, American missionary in China and Japan
- Margaret Burton (Madlax), fictional character from the anime series, Madlax
- Maggie Burton (poet), Canadian writer, musician and politician
- Maggie Burton, a character in the television series In the Flesh
