= May Court =

British parliamentary official (1880–1945)

Hannah Frances Mary (May) Court (3 December 1880 – 19 April 1945) was a British parliamentary official, the first woman to achieve executive and managerial roles within the Palace of Westminster. She was employed as a clerical assistant in 1918, and rose by 1927 to become head of the accounting and copying department in the House of Lords, a position she retained until her retirement in 1944.

== Biography ==
Hannah Frances Mary Court, known as May Court, was born in Streatham, London on 3 December 1880. Her father, Thomas Ambrey Court, was by the time of her birth working as accountant at the House of Lords. May Court took work as a teacher in 1901, at a boarding school in Wandsworth, later moving to an embroidery job in Chelsea. Her twin brother, Robert Ambrey Court, followed his father and was employed before World War I in the Lords accounting and copying department; but he was killed in 1917 in Northern France.

May Court entered employment at the House of Lords on 1 April 1918 as a lady clerical assistant; not as a direct replacement for her brother, but rather as an employee connected by family at a time of shortage of male candidates. May Court and another employee, Mabel Evelyn Waterman, were the first two women to be taken on in administrative roles; all prior women appointments had been involved in catering and cleaning duties. Court was promoted to Accountant in 1919, where she became responsible for the administration of salaries and pensions, the payment of invoices, and the keeping and presentation to the House of Lords of accounts.

In 1927, she was promoted to the position of head of the House of Lords accounting and copying department, responsible for a staff of three, until 1936, all women. Her promotion was reported in the press in hostile fashion as ‘the monstrous regiment of women has captured one of the high administrative posts in the House of Lords staff.' She was the first woman Officer of the House of Lords since Jane Julia Bennett in the 19th century, and the sole woman employed by the House of Lords in a managerial position from 1927 until Maude Waddell became head of the Refreshment Department in 1939.

During the second World War she took on additional responsibilities as a reserve fire spotter in Chelsea. She was awarded an OBE in 1942 and retired on 1 July 1944. She died, unmarried and without issue, on 19 April 1945 in Kensington of uterine cancer and heart failure.

== See also ==
- Jane Julia Bennett first woman Officer of the House of Lords
- Mary Howard Ashworth, first Official Typist to Parliament
- Girl Porters, employed in the House of Commons during the First World War
- Jean Winder, first woman Hansard reporter
- Kay Midwinter, first woman Clerk in the House of Commons
