= Senator Barton =

Senator Barton may refer to:

- Charles K. Barton (1886–1958), New Jersey Senate
- David Barton (politician) (1783–1837), U.S. Senator from Missouri from 1821 to 1831
- William T. Barton (born 1933), Utah State Senate
