= Walter Burton =

Walter Burton may refer to:

- Walter Moses Burton, Texas state senator
- Walter John Burton, New Zealand photographer
