= George Burton =

George Burton may refer to:

- George Burton (actor) (1898–1955), American silent film actor
- George Burton (bishop) (1856–1931), English Roman Catholic Bishop
- George Burton (chronologer) (1717–1791), English chronologer
- George Burton (cricketer) (1851–1930), English cricketer from London
- George Burton (footballer, born 1871) (1871–1944), English footballer
- George Burton (rugby union) (1855–1890), English rugby international from Yorkshire
- George Burton (1910s footballer), English footballer
- Sir George William Burton, British-Canadian lawyer and judge
- George Burton (jazz musician), jazz musician

== See also ==
- George Burton Adams (1851–1925), American historian
- George Burton Hunter (1845–1937), English shipping magnate
