= Hardwicke Knight =

New Zealand photographer and writer (1911–2008)

- Born: 12 July 1911; Stoke Newington, London, England
- Died: 25 August 2008 (aged 97); Dunedin, New Zealand
- Occupation: Medical photographer
- Spouse: Mollie Saunders (m. 1939; died 1999)
- Children: 2
- Military career
- Allegiance: Great Britain
- Branch: Air Force
- Service years: 1930-1931
- Rank: Aircraftman Second Class
- Unit: No. 600 (City of London) Squadron

Frederic Hardwicke Knight, QSO (12 July 1911 – 25 August 2008) was a London-born photographer, historian and collector who spent most of his adult life in New Zealand.

He emigrated to New Zealand in 1957 to take up a medical photography position in Dunedin. He lived at Broad Bay until ten months before his death at a Dunedin nursing home. His publications include New Zealand's first comprehensive photographic history, many compilations of early Dunedin and Otago photographs, biographies of several early New Zealand photographers and of British photographer William Russell Sedgfield, three books of architectural history and a seminal history of the Otago Peninsula. He was awarded a QSO in 1991. An eccentric polymath, Knight was well known for his striking appearance, his ramshackle Broad Bay cottage crammed with his collections and his self-proclaimed exploits, most notably his claim to have found timbers on Mount Ararat that might have been Noah's Ark.

== Life in England ==
Knight was born in the North London suburb of Stoke Newington, the youngest of seven surviving children of Annie Sophia Hoskins and Charles Frederick Knight, a fancy goods salesman. (Note: Information supplied to Who's Who is not unfailingly reliable. The spelling of names given here is taken from the marriage certificate of Annie Sophia Hoskins and Charles Frederick Knight.) Annie was an accomplished artist whose father was a print dealer. Charles's parents were enterprising shop-keepers originally from the Northamptonshire town of Wellingborough, who claimed among their forebears the 16th-century printer of Bibles Christopher Barker and the botanist Joseph Banks.

The Knight family were staunch evangelical Christians. Despite periods of atheism, Knight continued to find inspiration in the Bible's teachings and stories throughout his life.

Knight's attended St John's College in Stoke Newington from the age of six. Suffering from a nervous complaint he was withdrawn and tutored at home before being enrolled in Paradise House School in Stoke Newington, also known as the Modern School. He then attended a London commercial college.

On graduating at the age of 16 he was employed by the National Union of Teachers as an advertising clerk, among other duties organising tours for holidaying teachers and accompanying tours of French battlefields. He later worked on the NUT's magazine The Schoolmaster. During the Great Depression he was made redundant more than once; other jobs included compiling ships' equipment inventories for Tankers Ltd and being a travelling salesman of silks and satins.

Never very dedicated to his paid employment, Knight spent long lunch hours exploring London and its second hand bookstalls and antique shops and taking photographs (a passion encouraged by his brother-in-law).

From February 1930 to September 1931 he was an Aircraftman Second Class (AC2) in the Royal Auxiliary Air Force No. 600 (City of London) Squadron.

In 1935 and 1936 Hardwicke went to Russia and subsequently wrote admiringly of the Stalinist regime. He claimed to have worked as a photographer on an Armenian archaeological excavation and as a photo-journalist while travelling through Russia, the Caucasus, Armenia and the Near East, and to have found timbers on Mount Ararat that could have been the remains of Noah's Ark.

In 1935 he met Mary (Mollie) Ada Saunders, an Islington woman three years younger than himself. After a few years of Communistic 'trial marriage' they were formally married in 1939.

Shortly after Britain declared war on Germany, the National Union of Teachers and its staff were evacuated to Toddington near Gloucester. Knight avoided conscription by joining the Friends' Ambulance Unit. At first set to nursing and fire watching duties, he was later seconded to the Emergency Medical Services' plastic surgery unit at the Gloucester City General Hospital as a medical photographer.

After the war Knight returned to London, his work at the NUT supplemented with freelance writing, photography, art work and editing. In 1949 a son, Simon, was born. Shortly after this Hardwicke was appointed Director of Medical Photography of Enfield Group Hospitals based at Chase Farm Hospital, Enfield. A daughter, Deborah, was born in 1951.

== Life in New Zealand ==
In 1957 the family emigrated to New Zealand where Knight took up the position of director of the medical photographic unit of the Otago Medical School and Dunedin Hospital. In 1965 he was elected president of the New Zealand Institute of Medical Photographers. Techniques of fluorescein angiography developed by Knight won international acclaim.

Knight was president of the Dunedin Film Society for several years starting in 1960 and that year also was elected president of the Otago Anthropological Society of which he was a founding member. He attended most of the society's archaeological excavations over the next four years, developing techniques for photographing and recording archaeological sites and writing an unpublished handbook on the subject.

In 1963-4 he was part of an archaeological expedition to Pitcairn Island sponsored by the United States National Science Foundation, during which he mapped the island and collected place-names and a wealth of other information which he wrote up in detail in a report and a private journal.

In 1967 the Archaeological Research Foundation, a Seventh-day Adventist group dedicated to finding Noah's Ark on Mount Ararat, paid Knight's travel expenses so he could show them where he had found timbers in 1936. Knight subsequently postulated the timbers were the remains of a shelter for animals, not a large boat, and claimed that after he left the ARF party he found archaeological evidence to support his theory that Noah and his family grazed their stock on Mount Ararat in summer.

Knight's interest in Otago local history began shortly after his arrival in New Zealand. Finding much of the area's history unrecorded he set about the task himself. Memoirs of the Otago Peninsula's inhabitants supplemented with information from archival material formed the basis of a series of 1968 Otago Daily Times articles under the pseudonym 'Sam Fossicker'. Knight's book Otago Peninsula: A local history (1978) was commended by the judges of the AM Sherrard Award

Knight's first book, Photography in New Zealand: A social and technical history (1971), was the country’s first comprehensive photographic history. He subsequently published numerous books of early Dunedin and Otago photographs with supporting historical information including Dunedin Then (1974), Princes Street by Gaslight (1977) and the popular seven-volume series Otago Cavalcade published between 1983 and 1985. In addition he wrote several biographies of early New Zealand photographers, notably one of the Burton Brothers (Burton Brothers : Photographers, 1980) and New Zealand Photographers : A selection (1981). He wrote articles for the British Journal of Photography and History of Photography magazine and was on the editorial board of the latter.

Buildings of Dunedin: An illustrated architectural guide to New Zealand's Victorian city (co-written with Niel Wales, 1988) and Church Building in Otago (1993) are his main contributions in the field of architectural history.

In 1983 he produced a volume of his own photographs (Hardwicke Knight Photographer) . The photographs covered several genres including photojournalism, art photography and portraiture (of which Mollie was a frequent subject) and travel photography which revealed his fascination with a country’s architecture as well as its people. He also painted in watercolours, oils and pen and ink and owned a hand printing press on which he produced his own book plates, title pages and cards.

Knight was an avid, obsessive collector, and his Broad Bay cottage and its makeshift additions became a virtual museum with his collections stacked floor to ceiling. He stored much of his photographic equipment at the Otago Museum, where he organised several photography exhibitions. In 1991 a significant part of Knight's photographic collection of over 20,000 items, specifically his collection of works by the Burton Brothers and a collection of vintage photographic equipment, was acquired by the Museum of New Zealand Te Papa Tongarewa, the country's national museum. His other collections were dispersed after his death; much was auctioned in Adelaide and items related to New Zealand were auctioned in Dunedin or sold privately to local museums.

In 1991 Knight was awarded a Queen's Service Order and in 1996 an award presented by The City of Dunedin 'in appreciation of outstanding achievements as a citizen of the City.' He returned to England only once, in 1992.

Knight's last years were troubled by failing eyesight, joint pain and digestive problems which were the legacy of a burst appendix in his early teens. Mollie died in 1999. A few years later Ursula Stockinger came from Germany to live with him at Broad Bay and cared for him until his admission to Glamis, a Dunedin nursing home, in 2007. Sally, as he called her, had originally met Knight in 1951 at Chase Farm Hospital where she was training to be a nurse.

== Publications ==
- Photography in New Zealand: A social and technical history, Dunedin: John McIndoe (1971)
- Silver jubilee: Dunedin Film Society, Dunedin: Dunedin Film Society (1973)
- Dunedin then, Dunedin: John McIndoe (1974)
- 1975: Matanaka: Otago’s first farm, Dunedin: John McIndoe (1975) (with Peter Coutts)
- Princes Street by gaslight: Photographs of Daniel Louis Mundy, Dunedin: John McIndoe (1976)
- Otago Peninsula: A local history, Dunedin: Allied Press (1978; revised 2nd ed. 1979)
- Cutten, William Henry: Letters revealing the life and times of William Henry Cutten, the forgotten pioneer, (principal author Stuart Greif, biographical introduction by Knight, 1979)
- Burton Brothers: Photographers, Dunedin: John McIndoe (1980)
- Brief biographies of Dunedin photographers, Dunedin: Albion Press (1980)
- The Ordeal of William Larnach (1981), Dunedin: Allied Press (1981)
- New Zealand Photographers: A selection, (1981)
- Hardwicke Knight photographer, Dunedin: Hardwicke Knight (1983)
- Otago Cavalcade, 1901–1905, Dunedin: Allied Press (1983)
- Otago Cavalcade, 1906–1910, Dunedin: Allied Press (1983)
- Otago Cavalcade, 1911–1915, Dunedin: Allied Press (1984)
- Otago Cavalcade, 1916–1920, Dunedin: Allied Press (1984)
- Otago Cavalcade, 1921–1925, Dunedin: Allied Press (1984)
- Otago Cavalcade, 1926–1930, Dunedin: Allied Press (1985)
- Otago Cavalcade, 1931–1935, Dunedin: Allied Press (1985)
- Dunedin: Early photographs: Second series from the Hardwicke Knight collection, Dunedin: Hardwicke Knight (1985)
- Otago: Early photographs: Third series from the Hardwicke Knight collection, Dunedin: Hardwicke Knight (1987)
- Buildings of Dunedin: An illustrated architectural guide to New Zealand's Victorian city, Dunedin: John McIndoe (1988) (with Niel Wales)
- People and buildings in early photographs of Dunedin: Fourth series from the Hardwicke Knight collection, Dunedin: Hardwicke Knight (1992)
- Church building in Otago, Dunedin: Hardwicke Knight (1993)
- The photography of Richard John Morris: An appreciation of his contribution to New Zealand portrait and view photography in the nineteenth century: Sixth series from the Hardwicke Knight collection, Dunedin: Hardwicke Knight (1995)
- Coxhead Brothers photography: Seventh series from the Hardwicke Knight collection, Dunedin: Hardwicke Knight (1996)
- Joseph Weaver Allen photographer, Eighth series from the Hardwicke Knight collection, Dunedin: Hardwicke Knight (1997)
- The residences of the Cargill family in Dunedin, Dunedin: Hardwicke Knight (1998)
- Sedgfield: The life and work of William Russell Sedgfield, pioneer photographer, Dunedin: Hardwicke Knight (1998)
- Glowing embers, Dunedin: Albion Press (2005) (with Bill Brosnan, Bruce E. Collins, Lewis Jackson and Geoff Weston)
- Murray, D. & Naghibi, S. (eds.) (2018). Hardwicke Knight: Through the Lens, London: August Studio. A compilation of Knight's 1950s colour slide images.
