= Jane Julia Bennett =

Jane Julia Bennett (c.1811 - 1893), née Wright, was House of Lords Housekeeper and the first woman Officer of the House of Lords.

== Career ==
The position of Housekeeper in the House of Lords in the early 19th century was a sinecure for which the holder did no work. The actual duties were carried out from 1812 by House of Lords doorkeeper William Wright, from 1818 in the name of the Deputy Housekeeper, Mary Wright, his wife

Their daughter, Jane Julia Wright, became Deputy Housekeeper of the House of Lords on the death of Mary in 1821. As Jane was only aged 11, the job was still performed by William until she turned 16 in 1827, when she was formally appointed to the role. William retired in 1832 and Jane took over all duties in person.

Jane was assisted by her step-mother, Elizabeth Wright, who was on duty the night of the Burning of Parliament in 1834. The Wright family lived in the Palace of Westminster and Jane lost all her possessions in the fire, worth £400. They also depended on visitor fees for their income, which was adversely affected by the fire for many years afterwards.

Jane married Edwin Bennett in 1840. Although he was initially assumed to have taken the role of Deputy Housekeeper, in fact she remained in charge and he appears in records as her deputy soon afterwards. He died in 1858.

In 1847 Jane was appointed Housekeeper of the House of Lords by Lord Willoughby de Eresby, the Lord Great Chamberlain. She had written to him that she felt ‘the entire care of the House of Lords’ rested on her. The post of Housekeeper was now no longer a sinecure but a Parliamentary appointment. Jane was awarded a salary of £150 plus £50 for servants. From 1857 she also had a palatial apartment over three floors in the new Palace of Westminster, near the public entrance to the House of Lords.

As House of Lords Housekeeper Jane was responsible for security and access to the building when the Lords was not sitting, controlling the keys to the House of Lords, and receiving visitors. She organised and supervised repairs and maintenance, and oversaw housemaids who did the cleaning. As an Officer of the House of Lords, she was the only senior woman on the staff of either the House of Lords or House of Commons during the 19th century. There were no others until the appointment of May Court as Accountant in the Lords and Kay Midwinter as Clerk in the House of Commons during the 20th century.

The Housekeeper's role and responsibilities diminished from the 1860s, with security passing to doorkeepers and police, and repairs to the Office of Works. Jane retired in 1877 and her successor, Ellen Lovegrove, was given responsibility only for cleaning, with other duties given to a new post of Resident Superintendent, held by a man.

Jane was awarded a pension of £270, matching her then salary. She moved with her family to Chigwell, Essex, and died in 1893.

== See also ==
- Elizabeth Favill, head cook and manager of Bellamy's Refreshment Rooms
