= Andrew Burton =

Andrew or Andy Burton may refer to:

- Andrew Burton (snowboarder) (born 1974), Australian snowboarder
- Andrew Burton (sculptor) (born 1961), English sculptor and academic
- Andy Burton (footballer) (1884–?), Scottish footballer
- Andy Burton (politician) (born 1942), Canadian politician
- Andy Burton (TV presenter), sports reporter and commentator
- A. M. Burton (1879–1966), American businessman and philanthropist

== See also ==
- Burton (name)
