= William Burton =

William, Willie, Bill, or Billy Burton may refer to:

== Academics ==
- William Burton (antiquary, died 1645) (1575–1645), author of The Description of Leicestershire, 1622, English translator of Achilles Tatius
- William Burton (antiquary, died 1657) (1609–1657), English schoolmaster and antiquary

== Arts and entertainment ==
- William Evans Burton (1804–1860), British actor and playwright
- William Shakespeare Burton (1824–1916), English genre and historical painter
- William Burton Walbert (1886–1959), American singer and composer
- William Francis Burton (1907–1995), British marine and landscape artist
- Rahn Burton (William Burton, 1934–2013), American jazz pianist
- Willie D. Burton, American production sound mixer

== Politics and law ==
- William Burton (Leicester MP) (fl. 1360s), represented Leicester (UK Parliament constituency)
- William Burton (MP for City of London) (died 1438)
- William Burton (died 1781) (c. 1695–1781), British Member of Parliament for Rutland 1730–1734
- William Burton (governor) (1789–1866), governor of Delaware
- William Henry Burton (1730-1818) Irish politician
- William Westbrooke Burton (1794–1888), British judge in New South Wales, Australia
- William Burton (Canadian politician) (1888–1944), mayor of Hamilton, Ontario
- Bill Burton (political consultant) (born 1977), American political consultant
- William C. Burton, American lawyer

== Sports ==
- William Burton (golfer) (1875–1914), American golfer
- Bill Burton (baseball) (fl. 1918), American baseball player
- Bill Burton (athlete) (1915–1984), American Olympic athlete
- Bill Burton (cricketer) (1922–2000), New Zealand cricketer
- William Burton (swimmer) (born 1941), Australian Olympic swimmer
- Willie Burton (born 1968), American basketball player
- Willie Burton (basketball, born 1962), American-New Zealand basketball coach and former player

== Others ==
- William Burton (priest) (died 1616), English clergyman
- W. K. Burton (William Kinnimond Burton, 1856–1899), British engineer, photographer and photography writer
- William Merriam Burton (1865–1954), American chemist
- William John Burton (1908–1985), New Zealand lithographic draughtsman, rifleman and archer

== Other uses ==
- Bill Burton Fishing Pier State Park, Maryland
