= Ellen Baylis =

British journalist (1902–1997)

Ellen Ada Baylis (20 April 1902 - 11 April 1997) was the first permanent woman member of the UK Parliamentary Press Gallery.

== Career ==
Ellen Baylis, known as ‘Bay’, joined Reuters Telegram Company in 1916 as a 14-year-old messenger girl during the First World War. She was appointed to Reuters’ parliamentary staff in 1927, working initially in shorthand, typing and editorial work. She married Tom Harris, another Reuters employee, in 1932 but continued working under her maiden name. She was known as the fastest typist in Fleet Street.

In November 1941 she became the first woman to obtain a permanent ticket to the Parliamentary Press Gallery because of shortages of male staff during the Second World War. She was appointed to the role by Valentine Harvey, Reuters chief of parliamentary news. She was the first woman to be accredited by the Serjeant at Arms as a member of the Parliamentary Press gallery. She held this post for 21 years, including reporting on Winston Churchill's war speeches in the House of Commons. She appeared in the House of Lords without a hat and was told to go and get one, which led to a change of rules about women wearing hats in the Lords.

She retired in 1967. After her husband's death, she became friendly with Bernard Taylor, whose wife had also died, eventually moving into his council house and partnering with him in his public duties.

She left an oral history recording at the Imperial War Museum.

== See also ==
- Jean Winder, first permanent woman Hansard reporter
