= Charles Frederick Eaton =

American architect (1842–1930)

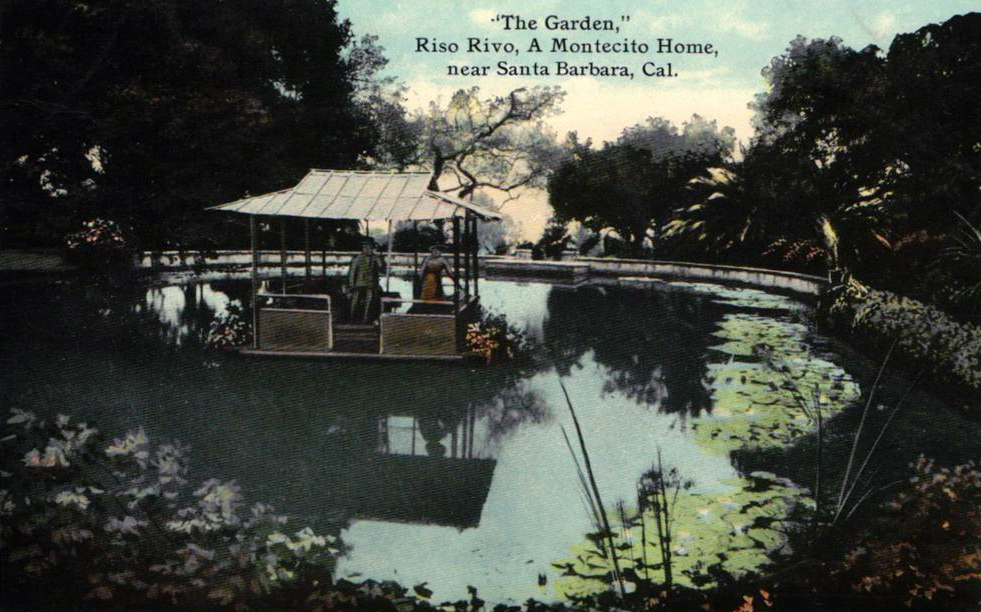
Postcard of the Montecito, California, estate of Riso Rivo's lotus garden and floating Japanese teahouse, designed by Charles Frederick Eaton, ca. 1890–1910.

Charles Frederick Eaton (1842–1930) was a California Arts and Crafts artist and landscape architect who helped introduce new plant species to the state.

== Art and design ==
Charles Frederick Eaton was born Dec. 12, 1842, in Providence, Rhode Island and went to Paris to train as a painter. Just as he was beginning to have his work accepted by the Paris Salon, however, an ongoing problem with arm cramps forced him to give up painting altogether. He moved his wife, Helen Justice Mitchell, and his daughter Elizabeth to the south of France, where he changed trades, becoming a furniture restorer and creator of furnishings like lamps, candlesticks, and bookends in such media as metal, glass, and leather.

Elizabeth suffered from health issues, so when she was around 17 the family emigrated to the west coast of the United States, settling down in then-semi-rural Montecito near Santa Barbara, California. Charles trained his daughter as an artist, and she later became well known under her married name of Elizabeth Eaton Burton. Charles and Elizabeth were both included in the 1904 St. Louis World's Fair and the 1909 Alaska-Yukon-Pacific Exposition as representatives of the southern California Arts and Crafts style. Charles's style shows his taste for the medieval, while his daughter's is more strongly influenced by Asian art.

== Horticulture ==
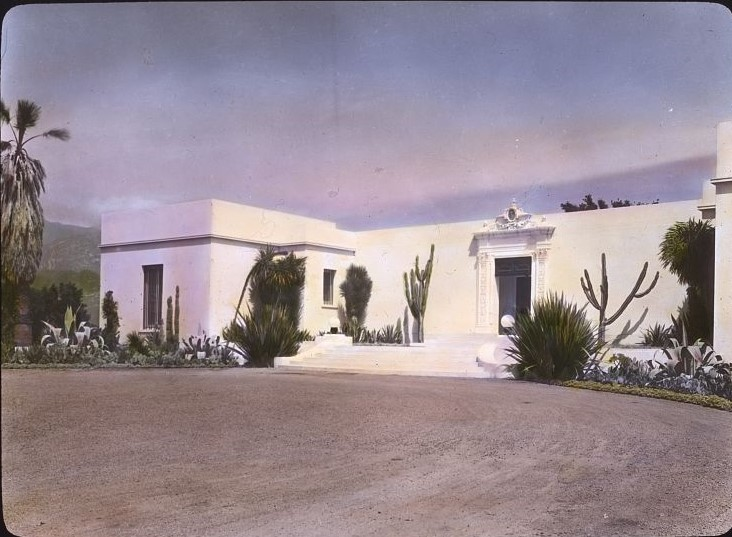
"Solana," Frederick Forrest Peabody house, Eucalyptus Hill Road, Montecito, by Frances Benjamin Johnston, 1917. Architect: Francis Townsend Underhill (1913–1914). Landscape: Charles Frederick Eaton, from 1906

In Montecito, Eaton—a lifelong amateur gardener—developed into a landscape architect and horticulturalist, and the house he built for his family, Riso Rivo, featured a lotus pond with a floating Japanese teahouse that gained him national attention. He planted an enormous variety of both native and non-native trees at Riso Rivo, including live oak, camphor, cinnamon, avocado, Abyssinian banana, candlenut, and many species of citrus and palms. Eaton was an early champion of planting trees with strong vertical lines like palms and cypresses to complement the dominant horizontal lines of sky, water, and shore along the California coast. Gustav Stickley, one of the American Arts and Crafts movement's most celebrated designers, praised Eaton's landscape work for its revolt "against the formality, the severe training and repression of Nature which constitute the first principles of the French and Italian systems of landscape gardening".

Eaton and the eminent Italian émigré horticulturalist Francesco Franceschi jointly founded the Southern California Acclimatizing Association in 1893 to introduce new species from around the world to California. It was initially headquartered at Riso Rivo, which accounts in part for the diversity of tree species planted there. Besides trees, Eaton and Franceschi grew many kinds of seeds at Riso Rivo in an attempt to determine which were suitable for southern California's Mediterranean climate. Their partnership ended after two years when Franceschi moved the SCAA away from Riso Rivo, but the SCAA is recognized as the first nursery to "scientifically evaluate new plants for California's climatic conditions".

Eaton also founded an annual Santa Barbara Floral Festival and promoted the planting of trees along city streets. He died in Santa Barbara on August 21, 1930.
