= Charlie Burton =

Charlie Burton may refer to:

- Charlie Burton (explorer), British explorer
- Charlie Burton, character in List of Person of Interest episodes

== See also ==
- Charles Burton (disambiguation)
