= Bellamy's =

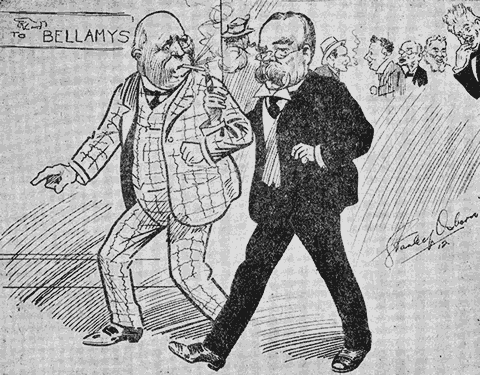
Reform leaders William Massey and James Allen head for Bellamy's to celebrate their victory over the Liberals and their assumption of government. (Cartoon in the New Zealand Spectator, 13 July 1912)

Bellamy's (or Bellamys) is the name given to the in-house catering service and dining facilities of the New Zealand Parliament. Named after an earlier British parliamentary institution, Bellamy's has been in existence since the establishment of the New Zealand Parliament in the 1850s. Originally the service was used exclusively by members of Parliament (MPs) and their guests, but it now includes a restaurant open to the public. Bellamy's has been based in the Beehive since the summer of 1975–76.

== History ==
John Bellamy was the deputy housekeeper of the British House of Commons who, in 1773, set up a small dining room for MPs. The original dining service expanded to include several lobbies for exclusive use of MPs. The British Bellamy's was destroyed in the burning of Parliament in 1834. The name Bellamy's was later adopted by New Zealand's colonial parliament for its refreshment facility. New Zealand's earliest Bellamy's in 1854 was a lean-to attached to the rear of the General Assembly House, Auckland.

In 1854 the first Bill passed by the New Zealand Parliament was the Licensing Amendment Act (informally called the "Bellamy's Bill") that permitted the sale of alcohol on the premises of Parliament. Bellamy's was modelled as a premier dining facility: silver plate, crockery and table linen were shipped from Britain.

With the relocation of Parliament, Bellamy's moved to Wellington in 1865. In 1907 a fire destroyed the parliament buildings, including Bellamy's dining hall. Bellamy's was then based in Government House to the south of Parliament House until its demolition for the construction of the Beehive in the 1970s.

External image
- Bellamy's menu—via Te Ara. "[A] menu from Bellamy's restaurant for 8 September 1955 shows that the fare on offer was mostly plain, with the occasional flourish such as 'Consomme Macedoine' and 'Dominion Trifle au Sherry'."

Bellamy's dining hall served as the main social gathering place for MPs and their guests. It was originally closed to women; the "No Women Permitted" sign over the dining hall was taken down in 1933 when the first female MP, Elizabeth McCombs, was elected. In the 1990s, the catering service was opened to all parliamentary staff as well as MPs. Since 2018, a restaurant called Bellamy's by Logan Brown is located in the Beehive, with table reservations now available to all members of the public. Due to accommodation difficulties, it was relocated from the third to the first floor in 2024; the cost of $7 million for the relocation was criticised by Opposition leader Chris Hipkins.

== Other facilities ==
In addition to Bellamy's, Parliament has Copperfield's Cafe and a bar in a former storage space on the first floor called "Pint of Order" (alluding to a point of order). The latter replaced Pickwicks on the third floor, which was removed to create more space for ministerial offices. Unlike Bellamy's, the public is not allowed to visit Pint of Order.

== See also ==
- New Zealand Parliament Buildings
