= Kate Burton =

Kate Burton may refer to:

- Kate Burton (actress) (born 1957), American actress of stage and television
- Kate Burton (aid worker) (born 1981), British aid worker who was kidnapped in the Gaza Strip in December 2005 and released later that month

== See also ==
- Catherine Burton (disambiguation)
- Katherine Burton (1890–1969), US Catholic convert and biographer
