= Charles Barton =

Charles or Charlie Barton may refer to:

- Charles Barton (British Army officer) (1760–1819), lieutenant-general
- Charles Barton (legal writer) (1768–1843), English legal writer
- Charles Barton (Queensland politician) (1829–1902)
- Charles Barton (New South Wales politician) (1848–1912)
- Charles Barton (New Zealand politician) (1852–1935), New Zealand farmer, businessman and mayor
- Charles Barton (cricketer) (1860–1919), English cricketer
- Charles J. Barton (1855–1923), American politician in Massachusetts
- Charles K. Barton (1886–1958), member of the New Jersey Senate
- Charles Barton (director) (1902–1981), American actor and director
- Charlie Barton (journalist) (1919/1920–1972), Canadian sports journalist
- Charles Barton (basketball), player in 2011 FIBA Europe Under-20 Championship
- Charlie Barton, a character in The Howling
