= James Burton (disambiguation) =

James Burton (born 1939) is an American guitarist.

James Burton may also refer to:

== Sportspeople ==
- James Burton (American football) (born 1972), former defensive back for the Chicago Bears
- Jim Burton (baseball) (1949–2013), American baseball player
- Jim Burton (ice hockey) (1963–2015), retired professional ice hockey defenceman

== Others ==
- James Burton (conductor) (born 1974), British conductor and composer
- James Burton (Egyptologist) (1788–1862), English Egyptologist
- James Burton (millowner) (1784–1868), English mill owner
- James Burton (priest) (1745–1825), English clergyman and canon of Christ Church, Oxford
- James Burton (property developer) (1761–1837), British property developer and architect
- James G. Burton, retired USAF colonel and author of The Pentagon Wars: Reformers Challenge the Old Guard
- James H. Burton (1823–1895), Confederate soldier
- James Ryder Burton (died 1876), British Royal Navy officer
- James Burton, the protagonist of the popular Gradius series and the most recurring character piloting the Vic Viper

== See also ==
- James Burton Telecaster, an electric guitar made by Fender
- James Burton Coffman (1905–2006), American preacher
- James Burton Robertson (1800–1877), English historian
