= Burton Brothers =

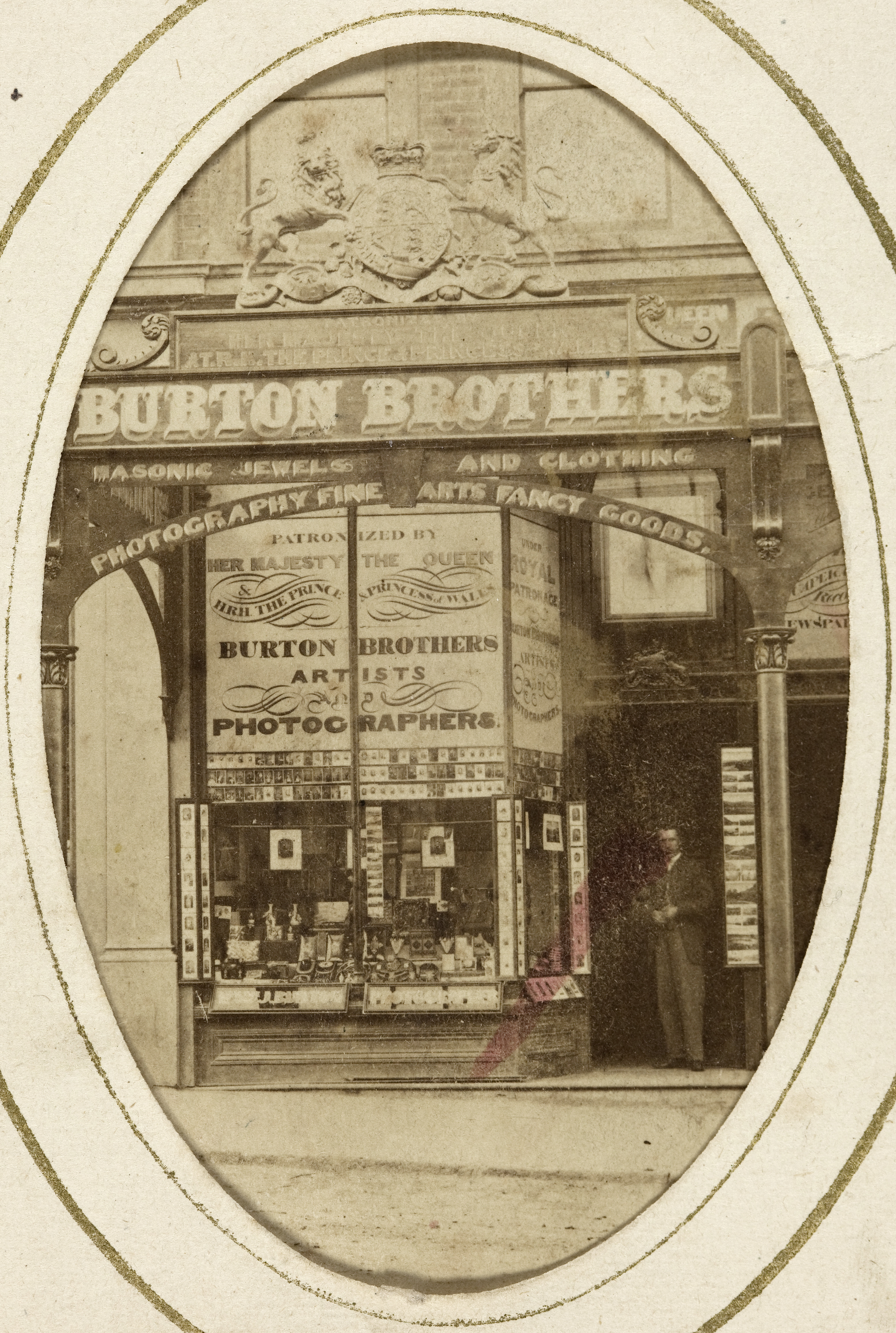
- Burton Brothers shop, circa 1870, Dunedin, by Burton Brothers
- Type: photographic studio
- Founded: 1866
- Defunct: 1914
- Headquarters: Dunedin, New Zealand

Burton Brothers (1866–1914) was one of New Zealand's most important nineteenth-century photographic studios and was based in Dunedin, New Zealand. It was founded by Walter John Burton (1836–1880) in 1866 as the Grand Photographic Saloon and Gallery and was situated in Princes Street, Dunedin.

Burton was a member of a prominent family of printers, bookbinders and photographers based in Derby, England, whose firm (John Burton and Sons) was founded by their father John Burton, and also included his other brothers, Alfred Henry (1834–1914), Oliver (born 1841), and John William Burton (born 1845). In 1856, Alfred emigrated to New Zealand, where he worked initially as a printer in Auckland before moving to Sydney in 1859 and from there back to England in 1862.

In 1866, Walter followed his brother's lead, moving with his wife Helen to Dunedin, at that time prosperous from the recent Otago gold rush, and founded a photographic business. The business proved successful, so in 1868 Walter asked his brother Alfred to join him in the venture. Alfred travelled to New Zealand with his wife Lydia and daughter Oona, and the two brothers formed a business partnership under the name Burton Brothers. The firm proved a major success, with Alfred travelling throughout the country to take landscape photographs while his brother Walter concentrated on portraiture in Dunedin. The firm became very successful, providing both a studio portraiture service for the settlers and images of New Zealand landscapes and scenes of ethnographic interest including Maori portraiture, which were in high demand by tourists and travellers to New Zealand and by other collectors around the world. Images were sold individually as prints and postcards and also as series in albums through agents and distributors.

The Burton Brothers pioneered the use of travelling darkrooms, commissioning a special photographic van to be built in 1869 which served both as a mobile darkroom and as a safe method for transporting their heavy and delicate equipment.

Despite the partnership's success, it ended as early as 1877, largely through personal differences caused by Walter's heavy drinking. Alfred was joined by his younger brother John and employed other talented photographers such as George Moodie and Thomas Muir, while Walter set up an independent studio. In 1880, Walter committed suicide, and John, saddened, returned to England. Alfred Burton continued to business with Moodie and Muir as his partners until retiring in 1898. He died in Dunedin in 1914. Moodie and Muir continued to run the firm under the same name until its eventual closure in 1916.

Alfred Burton, in particular, is considered one of 19th-century New Zealand's most notable photographers, and his series of images of Maori in the southwestern North island is of major significance. This series, "Through the King Country with a camera: a photographers diary", was published in the Otago Daily Times in 1885. His spectacular images of Fiordland were in part responsible for the New Zealand Government naming the region as a National Park.

During the 1880s Alfred travelled extensively through the South Pacific, photographing scenes of village life in Samoa, Fiji, and Tonga. He also produced a series of images of the devastation caused by the 1886 eruption of Mount Tarawera, rephotographing locations which he had previously visited some years before the eruption.

Many of the Burton Brothers' works and much of their original equipment were collected by Dunedin photographer and historian Hardwicke Knight, and are now housed in the Museum of New Zealand Te Papa Tongarewa in Wellington.
