= Kathleen Margaret Midwinter =

First female clerk in UK House of Commons

- Born: 6 March 1909; Wednesbury, England
- Died: 6 August 1995 (aged 86); Geneva, Switzerland
- Other name: Kathleen Midwinter-Vergin
- Occupation: civil servant
- Employer(s): League of Nations, House of Commons and United Nations
- Known for: first woman clerk in the House of Commons
- Spouse: Lieutenant-Colonel Arthur Herbert Vergin OBE

Kathleen "Kay" Margaret Midwinter became Kathleen Midwinter-Vergin (6 March 1909 – 6 August 1995) was a British secretary at the League of Nations who became the first female clerk in the House of Commons and went on to be a United Nations official.

== Life ==
Midwinter was born in Wednesbury in 1909.

She joined the League of Nations secretariat in 1930 when she was 21. She put her success in obtaining the job down to her ability with French, passing exams, gaining diplomas and her good looks. She remembered her work at the League of Nations as including research, statistical work, minute-writing, committee procedure and summarising speeches delivered in English and French.

In 1940 the League of Nations suspended its staff and Midwinter returned to the UK where she applied for work at the House of Commons at a time when they wanted to free male employees for military service. Her nine years experience at the League of Nations meant that she was successful, and made newspaper stories as the first woman to be appointed a "temporary" clerk. She was first assigned to assist an existing clerk to a select committee but she was given her own committee in April 1941. In 1942 she had an additional task which was to clerk a small sub-committee of women MPs that was looking at women's medical services. She was working for Irene Ward and Joan Davidson who sat on the main National Expenditure Committee. Midwinter impressed Ward and Davidson as she moved their report forward, calling in witnesses, handling correspondence and dealing with government departments. Ward and Davidson returned the favour by championing her pay which was well below her male peers. Midwinter was also present in the House of Commons during some of Winston Churchill's great war speeches, and remembered he used to glare at her.

Ward and Davidson arranged for Midwinter to join the Foreign Office, which they saw as the last bastion of male tradition, in 1943. There, Midwinter faced hostility in the economic relations department but she was rescued when Philip Noel-Baker became the minister whom she knew from her League of Nations days. She helped to wind up the loose ends of the League of Nations. She was one of only fourteen women who were involved in planning the United Nations, as adviser to the UK delegation to the Preparatory Commission for the United Nations. Between 1946 and 1953 she worked at the U.N. in New York, and between 1954 and 1969 she worked at the U.N In Geneva.

In 1969 she married a fellow civil servant (former Lieutenant-Colonel) Arthur Herbert Vergin OBE. He died in 1978.

Midwinter died in Geneva in 1995. Her papers are in the Bodleian Library.

== See also ==
- Jane Julia Bennett, first woman Officer of the House of Lords
- May Court, first woman Accountant in the House of Lords
- Mary Howard Ashworth, first Official Typist to Parliament
- Jean Winder, first woman Hansard reporter
