= Hal B. Burton =

American politician in Arkansas

Hal B. Burton was an American state legislator in Arkansas. He represented Jefferson County, Arkansas in the Arkansas House of Representatives in 1887. He was a Republican and served one term.

In 1880 he was a farmer; in the 1890s, he worked as a merchant and saloon manager. In 1908, he was listed as a porter, in the city directory of Pine Bluff, Arkansas, and may have died there between 1910 and 1920. His third wife was documented as a sower.

He was the great-great-grandfather of actor LeVar Burton. On a 2024 episode of the PBS program, Finding Your Roots, featuring LeVar Burton, it was noted that Hal Burton was described in one contemporary newspaper account as a "gay lothario" and accused of being a womanizer.

== See also ==
- African American officeholders from the end of the Civil War until before 1900
