= Loveliveserve =

American comedy duo

- Born: United States
- Occupation: YouTube personalities

YouTube information
- Channel: loveliveserve
- Genres: Comedy; comedy duo
- Subscribers: 8.55 million
- Views: 2.3 billion
- Last updated: February 11, 2026

Loveliveserve is a YouTube channel for the American comedy duo composed of Ryan Burton, known on YouTube as "Rhino", and Noah Taitano, known on YouTube as "Noah Boat".

Burton and Taitano were friends since elementary school. By 2015 their YouTube channel reached 3 million followers and 40 million average views per month, and was earning over six figures per year through brand deals and advertising.

After graduating high school, they had to choose whether to attend college or work as full-time YouTube celebrities. Both Burton's and Taitano's parents encouraged them to attend college, which they ultimately did, enrolling at Drexel University to study television and film production.

Taitano and Burton's YouTube channel is known for launching internet memes.

Loveliveserve also has its own TikTok channel with over two million subscribers.
