= Mary Howard Ashworth =

English businesswoman (1863–1928)

- Born: 10 February 1863; Holme Abbey
- Died: 21 February 1928 (aged 65); South Kensington
- Occupations: Secretary, Businesswoman, Entrepreneur
- Known for: First official typist to the Houses of Parliament.

Mary Howard Ashworth (10 February 1863 – 21 February 1928), known as May Ashworth, was an English businesswoman who won the contract to provide official typing services to the Houses of Parliament in 1895 and remained Official Typist to Parliament to her death in 1928.

== Early life ==
Ashworth was born in Holme Abbey in Cumbria. Her mother was Sarah (born Bewley) and her father, Arthur Ashworth, was the vicar of Holme Cultram. She was the first born of their seven children. Her father died when she was eleven, but the family were provided for and she enjoyed an education that included trips abroad.

== Career ==
She moved to London, and set up her own business, Ashworth & Co, in 1888 at the age of 25, by working long hours in Westminster. She was living in Battersea with her mother and she had trained in typing and Pitman shorthand. She started with two rooms and she went on to offer training courses for the "best class of young gentlewomen". These women learned the business and several started their own businesses or working for members of parliament.

The British members of parliament had no facilities for getting documents typed. Ashworth managed to win the contract as she had reduced her bid to 80% of what was officially recommended. She justified the reduction because she knew that parliament would supply the premises and therefore she would have lower overheads. The contract was announced on 29 March 1895. Ashworth offered typing and dictation to parliamentarians where she employed a manager. She kept her existing offices. At this time all of the members of parliament would have been men. Ashworth and her staff may have been frequently the only women in the room.

In 1898 an article in Woman's Life noted that she was a workaholic. Her one indulgence, she said, was occasionally cycling before breakfast. She noted that MPs would frequently arrive in the typing office and begin dictation and they were frequently surprised at the speed of her workers.

Ashworth's business expanded and in time she was also offering translation of documents from a wide range of languages. She negotiated a new agreement with Parliament in 1919. By 1925, 250 MPs were using Ashworth's service, which employed 14 staff in the Houses of Parliament.

== Personal life ==
Ashworth married William Paull Jewill-Rogers when she was 37, although stated her age as being 34 to his 24 on the paperwork. She continued to run the business after marriage but made her husband a partner, although he is not thought to have been heavily involved. Ashworth filed for divorce in 1919 on grounds of adultery and desertion, and retained control of the business.

== Death and legacy ==
Ashworth died in South Kensington. She left bequests to her employees linked to the time that they had been with her company. When her last sister died, her estate was given to the Professional Classes Aid Council with instructions that the money should be used to benefit only women.

Her business Ashworth & Co continued under her successor Gladys Gowdey, and it still held the Houses of Parliament contract until after 1945. It was taken over in the 1960s by Norma Skemp.

== See also ==
- May Court, first woman Accountant in the House of Lords
- Jean Winder, first woman Hansard reporter
- Kay Midwinter, first woman Clerk in the House of Commons
