= Metropolitan and City Police Orphanage =

The Metropolitan and City Police Orphanage was an orphanage for children of officers in the Metropolitan Police and City of London Police. It was established on 1 January 1870 as the Metropolitan Police Orphanage, opened its building at Fortescue House in Twickenham the following October and extended to the City of London Police in 1871. It moved to Wellesley House on Hampton Road, also in Twickenham, in 1874 and a War Memorial Hospital was added in its grounds in 1923. The Orphanage closed in 1937, handing Wellesley House to the Shaftesbury Homes, and the Metropolitan and City Police Orphans Fund was established in its place. The Wellesley House site was demolished and redeveloped in 1971.
