= George Burton (chronologer) =

English clergyman and chronologer

The Reverend George Burton (1717–1791) was an English clergyman and chronologer.

== Life ==
Burton was the second son of George Burton (1685-1758), who held the manor of Burton Lazars in Leicestershire and in 1710 served as High Sheriff of Leicestershire, and his wife Elizabeth Champion (1683-1739). His elder brother was Philip Burton (1710-1792), a lawyer and writer who inherited the family landholdings and by marrying Felicia Whitfield (1713-1791) became the father of Felicia Elizabetha Burton (1741-1821), the wife of George Horne, Bishop of Norwich.

He was born in 1717, and received his education at Catharine Hall, Cambridge, where he graduated B.A. in 1736, and M.A. in 1740, by the latter date having become a member of King's College, Cambridge. In 1740, he was presented to the rectory of Elveden, and in 1751, to that of Herringswell, both in Suffolk, holding both livings for the rest of his life. Burton took pupils, and generally had three or four boarding in his house for instruction.

In London on 9 July 1743, he married Anna Reeve, daughter of the steward of the Burton Lazars estate, John Reeve of Melton Mowbray, and his wife Joanna Hawley. No children are known. Anne's brother William Reeve, a lawyer in Melton Mowbray, acquired by marriage Leadenham House and its estate.

He died at Bath on 3 November 1791, and was buried in the church of Walcot.

== Works ==
He published:

- 'An Essay towards reconciling the Numbers of Daniel and St. John, determining the Birth of our Saviour, and fixing a precise time for the continuance of the present Desolation of the Jews; with some conjectures and calculations pointing out the year 1764 to have been one of the most remarkable in history,' Norwich, 1766.
- 'A Supplement to the Essay upon the Numbers of Daniel and St. John, confirming those of 2436 and 3430, mentioned in the Essay; from two numerical prophecies of Moses and our Saviour,' London, 1769.
- 'The Analysis of Two Chronological Tables, submitted to the candour of the public: The one being a Table to associate Scripturally the different Chronologies of all Ages and Nations; the other to settle the Paschal Feast from the beginning to the end of time,' London, 1787.
- 'History of the Hundred of Elvedon, Suffolk,' MS. in the library of Sir Thomas Phillipps.

== Reputation ==
The Reverend George Ashby considered him a person of great industry in chronology, but added: 'I could never perceive what his principles or foundations were, though I have attended in hopes of learning them.' He was, however, a friend of the Reverend William Stukeley, the famous antiquarian, who made him a present of The Description of Britain, the ingenious forgery by Charles Bertram.
