= Alfred Henry Burton =

New Zealand photographer

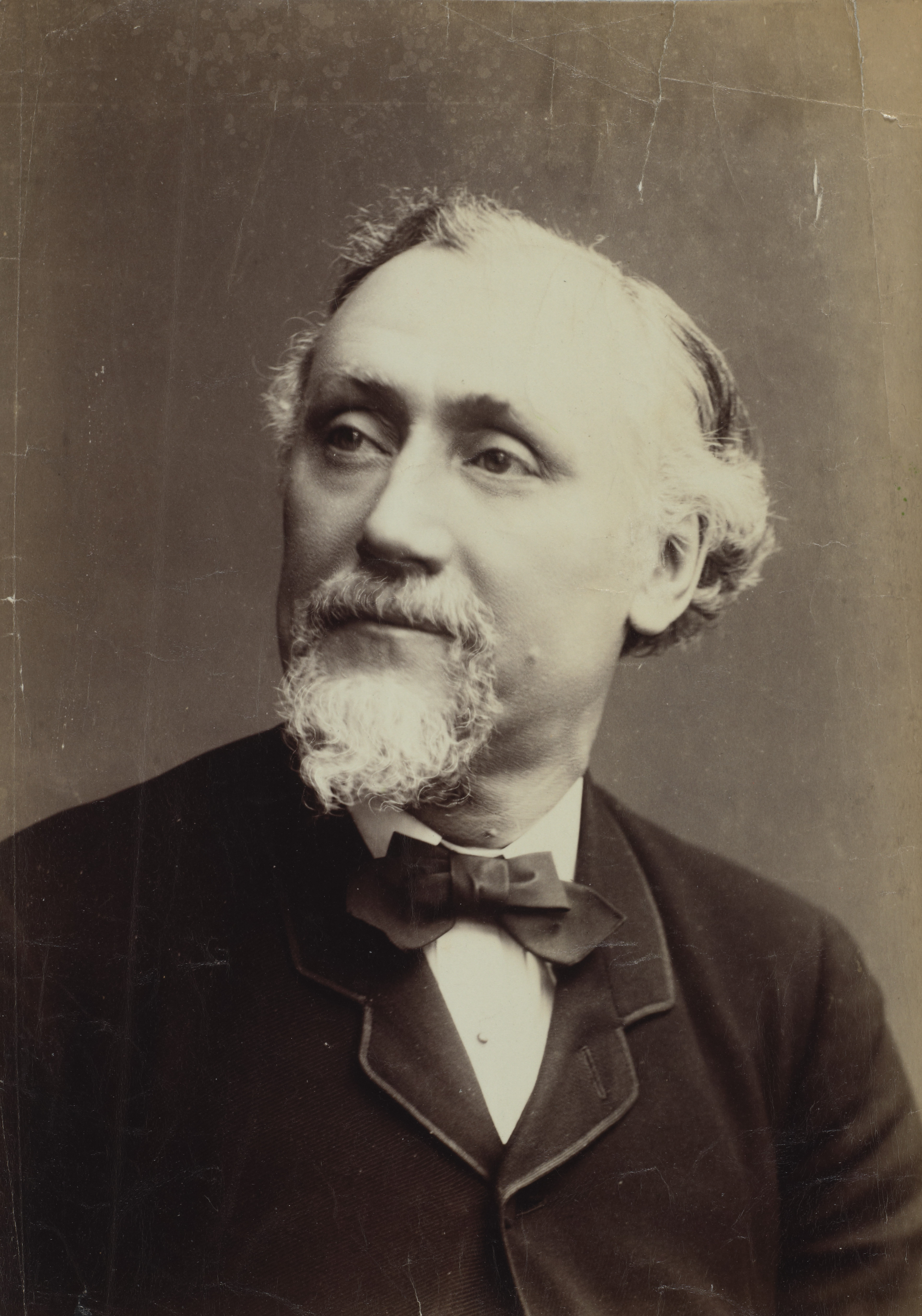
Alfred Henry Burton, photograph by Thomas Mintaro Bailey Muir

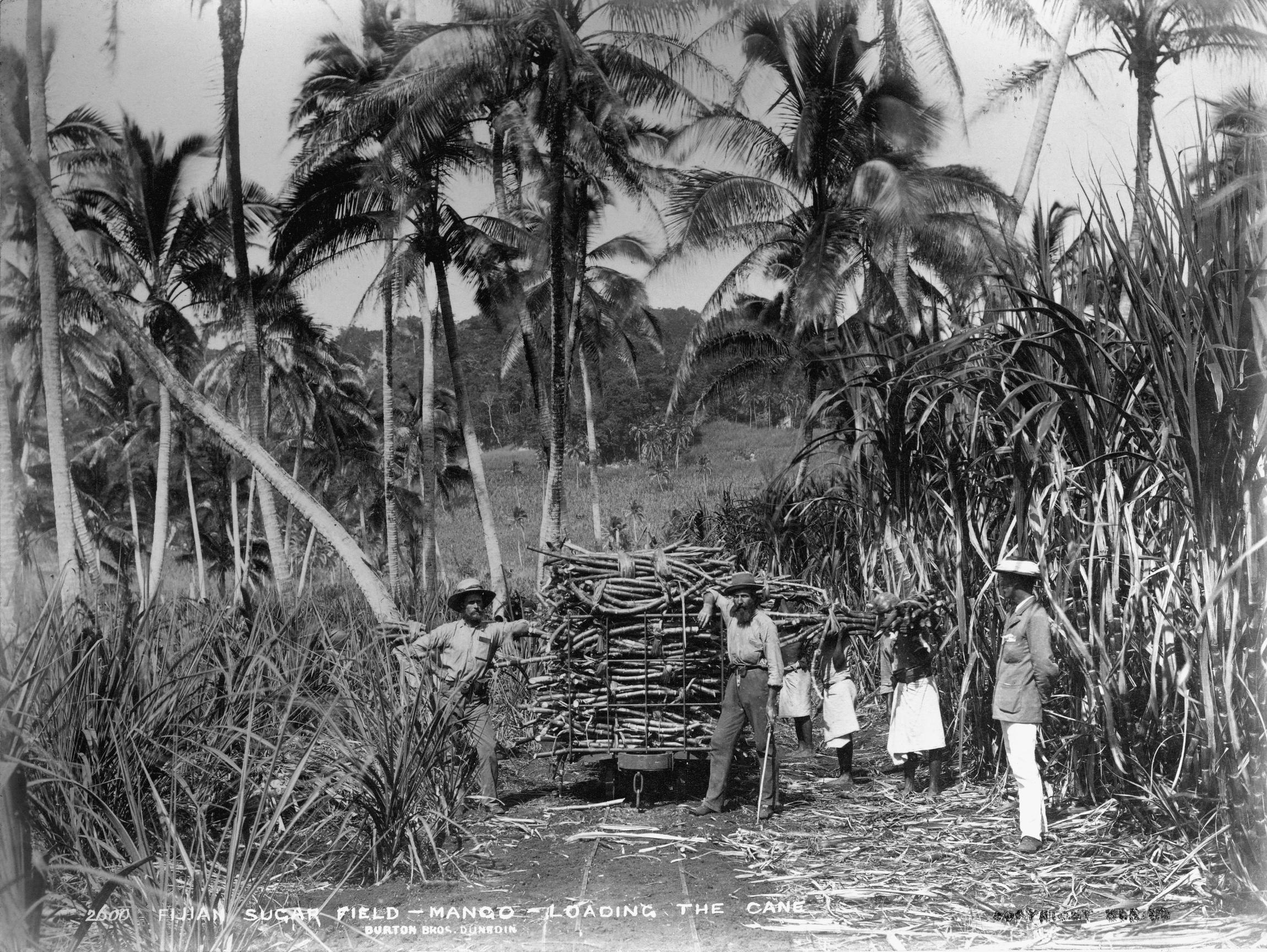
Loading cane at a sugar plantation on Mago island, Fiji; 1884.

Alfred Henry Burton (c. 1834 – 2 February 1914) is a nineteenth-century New Zealand photographer.

== Biography ==
Burton was born in Leicester, England. His father, John Burton, was a photographer and his firm was called John Burton and Sons. Burton and his three brothers also did photography. His brother Walter John Burton emigrated to New Zealand first and after being inundated with work requested Alfred join him, and in 1868 he did. The business was renamed Burton Brothers. Alfred Burton travelled in New Zealand taking landscape images for the business including Fiordland, the Southern Lakes and South Westland.

In 1877 the brother business partnership split up. Walter left for Europe and Alfred took over the firm. He employed other photographers such as George Moodie and Thomas Muir. A trip to the Pacific Islands in 1884 had Burton creating staged photographs of people and villages.

Significant photographs of Burtons were taken during 1885 to 1886 when he went to the King Country in the western North Island of New Zealand. With little contact of photography the Māori people in the photographs didn't pose and the 150 plates he took are now considered useful ethnographic portraiture.

After the destruction of the New Zealand tourist attraction the Pink and White Terraces in 1886 Burton took new photos, his 'before and after' shots were useful to researchers. Burton continued practicing with the Burton Brothers business in the 1880s but had stopped by 1889. The business continued and prospered from a demand for postcards in the early 1900s. Henry Burton the son of Burton who worked at the business as a photographer, was killed in a horse accident in 1901.

After his retirement from photography Burton invested is time in theatrical and other pursuits. He helped found the Dunedin Shakespeare Club, he started writing and there was an elocution school that his daughter Oona Burton worked at for a time.

Burton came ninth in the three-member City of Dunedin electorate in the 1896 election.

Burton died in 1914.
