= Ralph Burton =

Ralph Burton may refer to:

- Ralph Burton (British Army officer), British soldier and MP, and Canadian settler
- Ralph Burton (Leicester MP) (fl. 1322–1340)
- Ralph Wallace Burton, artist
- Ralph Burton, character in The World, the Flesh and the Devil (1959 film)
