= William Francis Burton =

English painter

William Francis Burton (1 January 1907 in North Walsham, Norfolk – 21 October 1995 in Colchester, Essex) was a prolific English marine and landscape artist, who painted in oils.

He drew inspiration for his work largely from his rural Norfolk upbringing and his adopted home county of Essex. West Mersea was a particular favourite and Burton is best remembered for his depictions of golden oyster beds and Turneresque skies, his most renowned work reproduced in 1965 is 'Evening Gold'. In the late 1960s his reproductions were selling more than any other British artist, past or present.

Burton was self-taught but often acknowledged the guidance and inspiration of his first wife's father the Irish artist William Crampton Gore RHA (1871–1946). Burton spent a year in Australia (1964–1965) perfecting his technique before becoming a professional and commercially successful artist in the early sixties after retiring from the Civil Service. Burton's style was detailed draughtsmanship with earthy colour; his landscapes were distinctive by the addition of a strategically placed toadstool and, in his marine-scapes, a green bottle (although this is not obvious in his earlier work).

Burton died in Colchester, Essex in 1995 at the age of 88. Sixteen of his original works were reproduced as prints in the 1960s by the publishers Soloman and Whitehead London.
