= George Burton (footballer, born 1871) =

English footballer (1871–1944)

Personal information
- Full name: George Frederick Burton
- Date of birth: 10 September 1871
- Place of birth: Aston, England
- Date of death: 1944 (aged 72–73)
- Position: Wing half

Senior career*
Years	Team	Apps	(Gls)
1887–1888	Birmingham St Luke's		
1888–1889	Aston Shakespeare		
1889–1892	Walsall Town Swifts		
1892–1898	Aston Villa	52	(2)
1898	Bristol Eastville Rovers		
Total		52	(2)
- * Club domestic league appearances and goals

George Frederick Burton (10 September 1871 – 1944) was an English footballer who played in the Football League for Aston Villa.
