= Catharine Burton =

English Discalced Carmelite nun

Catharine Burton (1668–1714), also known by her religious name Mary Xaveria of the Angels, was an English Discalced Carmelite.

== Life ==
She was born at Beyton, Suffolk, near Bury St Edmunds, on 4 November 1668 as one of ten children of Thomas and Mary Burton. After his wife died, Thomas Burton brought up the children alone, instead of entering a monastery as a laybrother as he had intended to do. Two of Catharine's sisters became nuns also (one of them entering the same Carmelite convent as Catharine), one of her brothers a priest.

Feeling called to the monastic life, Burton went to the Spanish Netherlands. There she entered the monastery of the English Discalced Carmelite nuns at Antwerp in 1693. She chose the religious name Mary Xaveria of the Angels and made her religious profession in 1694. Although she repeatedly suffered from severe illness, she was several times elected prioress of her monastery, where she died on 9 February 1714, living a reputation of sanctity, particularly, as later on her body was found to be incorrupt.

A Life of her, collected from her own writings and other sources by Thomas Hunter, remained in manuscript until 1876, when it was published by Burns and Oates, under the editorial supervision of Henry James Coleridge. A further edition appeared in 2010 from Cambridge University Press.
