= Charles Burton (theologian) =

English clergyman and writer

Charles Burton (1793–1866) was an English clergyman and writer. Burton was a Methodist minister but eventually joined the Church of England. He was botanist and member of the Linnean Society.

== Life ==
Burton was born in 1793 at Rhodes Hall, Middleton, Lancashire, the seat of his father Daniel Burton, a cotton manufacturer, of whom he was the youngest son. He was educated at the University of Glasgow and St John's College, Cambridge, where he graduated LL.B. in 1822. In 1829 he was incorporated B.C.L. at Magdalen College, Oxford, on 14 October, and received the degree of D.C.L. on the following day.

His family were Wesleyans, and he was for a time a Methodist minister, but was ordained in the Church of England in 1816. The church of All Saints, Manchester was built by him at a cost of £18,000 and consecrated in 1820, when he became rector, after serving for a short time as curate of St James's in the same town. Most of the church was destroyed by fire on 6 February 1850.

Burton was a botanist, and his discovery in Anglesey of a plant new to science led to his election as Fellow of the Linnean Society. While on a visit at Western Lodge, Durham, he was attacked by typhus fever, and died after three weeks' illness on 6 September 1866.

== Works ==
His theological views, in the face of the geological controversies set off by Charles Lyell, were conservative but not literalist about the Biblical account. He followed William Paley, and the gap theory of Thomas Chalmers and John Bird Sumner.

His writings are:

- 'Horæ Poeticæ,' 1815.
- 'Middleton, an elegiac poem,' Glasgow, 1820 (printed for private circulation).
- 'A Selection of Psalms and Hymns, including original compositions,' Manchester, 1820.
- 'The Bardiad, a poem in two cantos,' London (Manchester), 1823. This had a second edition in the same year.
- 'A Sermon on the Parable of the Barren Figtree,' London (Manchester), 1823.
- 'Three Discourses adapted to the opening of the Nineteenth Century; exhibiting the portentous and auspicious signs and cardinal duties of the times,' Manchester, 1825.
- 'The Day of Judgment, a Sermon on the death of Ann, wife of Rev. John Morton,' Manchester, 1826.
- 'The Servant's Monitor' (? Manchester, 1829). This was originally published at the expense of the Manchester Society for the Encouragement of Faithful Female Servants.
- 'Sentiments appropriate to the present Crisis of unexampled Distress; a Sermon,' Manchester, 1826.
- 'Discourses suited to these Eventful and Critical Times,' London, 1832 (preached at the Episcopal Chapel, Broad Court, Drury Lane, London, of which Burton is said, on the title-page, to be minister).
- 'A Discourse on Protestantism, delivered on the occasion of admitting two Roman Catholics to the Protestant Communion' (? Manchester, 1840).
- 'The Church and Dissent: an appeal to Independents, Presbyterians, Methodists, and other Sects, &c.,' Manchester, 1840.
- 'The Watchman's Cry, or Protestant England roused from her Slumber; a Discourse,' Manchester, 1840.
- 'Lectures on the Millennium,' London, 1841. The millennium is to begin in 1868.
- 'Lectures on the World before the Flood,' London (Manchester), 1844. An attempt to harmonise the literal narrative of Genesis with the discoveries of science.
- 'Lectures on the Deluge and the World after the Flood,' London (Manchester), 1845.
- 'Lectures on Popery,' Manchester, 1851.
- 'A Demonstration of Catholic Truth by a plain and final Argument against the Socinian Heresy, a discourse,' Manchester, 1853.
- 'The Comet,' 'The World on Fire,' The World after the Fire,' 'The New Heaven and the New Earth,' single sermons issued in 1858.
- 'The Antiquity of the British Church, a lecture,' Manchester, 1861. This is a pamphlet on the Liberation Society controversy.
