= Albert Woolley (footballer) =

English footballer

Personal information
- Full name: Albert Woolley
- Date of birth: 1871
- Place of birth: Hockley, England
- Date of death: 1896 (aged 24–25)
- Position: Winger

Senior career*
| Years | Team | Apps | (Gls) |
| 1891–1892 | Park Mills | | |
| 1892–1895 | Aston Villa | 20 | (13) |
| 1895 | Derby County | 6 | (3) |
| Total | | 26 | (13) |
- * Club domestic league appearances and goals

Albert Woolley (1871–4 February 1896) was an English footballer who played in the Football League for Aston Villa and Derby County. He was described as "a very fine outside left forward, combining great speed with cleverness and dash" and as a "speedy forward, tricky dodger, and fine accurate shot at goal". He died of consumption aged just 24, whilst in dispute with Derby County over non-payment of his wages. The club paid £45 to Woolley's parents on his death to settle the claim.
