= David Skea =

Scottish footballer

Personal information
- Full name: David Frederick Skea
- Date of birth: February 1871
- Place of birth: Arbroath, Scotland
- Date of death: c. 1950 (aged 78–79)
- Place of death: Scotland
- Position: Inside forward

Senior career*
| Years | Team | Apps | (Gls) |
- Arbroath
| 1892 | Aston Villa | 1 | (1) |
- Dundee Thistle
| 1893 | Darwen | 1 | (0) |
| 1893–1894 | Bury | 1 | (0) |
| 1894–1896 | Leicester Fosse | 45 | (28) |
| 1896 | Swindon Town | 6 | (5) |
| 1896–1898 | New Brompton | 25 | (9) |
- Cowes
- * Club domestic league appearances and goals

David Frederick Skea (February 1871 – c. 1950) was a Scottish footballer.

== Football career ==
He began his career with his hometown club, Arbroath, before joining Aston Villa, where he made just one appearance in the English Football League. After a spell back in Scotland with Dundee Thistle, he moved to Darwen, where again he was restricted to a single Football League game before a move to Bury of the Lancashire League.

In 1894 he joined Leicester Fosse, where he spent two seasons as a regular in the team, making 45 League appearances and scoring 28 goals. In the 1894–95 season, he was the top scorer in the Football League Second Division.

After leaving Filbert Street, he played for Swindon Town and New Brompton of the Southern League.
