= Ernie Burton =

English footballer

Personal information
- Full name: Ernest Burton
- Date of birth: 2 September 1921
- Place of birth: Sheffield, West Riding of Yorkshire, England
- Date of death: July 1999 (aged 77)
- Place of death: Sheffield, West Yorkshire, England
- Position: Winger

Senior career*
Years	Team	Apps	(Gls)
- Atlas & Norfolk Works
1947–1948	Sheffield Wednesday	0	(0)
1948	York City	3	(0)
Total		3	(0)
- * Club domestic league appearances and goals

Ernest Burton (2 September 1921 – July 1999) was an English professional footballer who played as a winger in the Football League for York City, in non-League football for Atlas & Norfolk Works, and was on the books of Sheffield Wednesday without making a league appearance.
