= James Burton Robertson =

Historian

James Burton Robertson (b. in London 15 Nov., 1800; d. Dublin 14 Feb., 1877) was a historian. The son of Thomas Robertson, a landed proprietor in Grenada, West Indies, where he spent his boyhood. In 1809 his mother brought him to England, and placed him at St. Edmund's College, Old Hall (1810), where he remained for nine years. In 1819 he began his legal studies, and in 1825 was called to the bar, but did not practise. For a time he studied philosophy and theology in France under the influence of his friends Lamennais and Gerbet.

In 1835 he published his translation of Friedrich Schlegel's Philosophy of History, which passed through many editions. From 1837 to 1854 he lived in Germany and Belgium. During this time he translated Möhler's Symbolism, adding an introduction and a life of Möhler. This work considerably influenced some of the Oxford Tractarians. In 1855 John Henry Newman nominated Robertson as professor of geography and modern history in the Catholic University of Ireland. In this capacity he published two series of lectures (1859 and 1864), as well as Lectures on Edmund Burke (1869), and a translation of Dr. Hergenröther's Anti Janus (1870) to which he prefixed a history of Gallicanism. He also wrote a poem, The Prophet Enoch (1859), and contributed several articles to the Dublin Review. His services to literature obtained for him a pension from the Government in 1869, and the degree of Doctor of Philosophy from Pius IX (1873). He is buried in Glasnevin Cemetery.
