= Steve Burton =

Steve Burton may refer to:

- Steve Burton (actor) (born 1970), American actor
- Steve Burton (footballer, born 1982), English footballer for Östersunds FK, formerly Kidderminster Harriers and Richmond, amongst others
- Steve Burton (footballer, born 1983), English footballer for Balcatta SC, formerly Scarborough and Crawley Town, amongst others
- Steve Burton (sports journalist), television sports reporter for WBZ-TV and WSBK-TV in Boston
- Steve Burton, character in Babies for Sale
