= Clarence Burton (disambiguation) =

Clarence Burton (1882–1933) was an American actor.

Clarence Burton may also refer to:

- Clarence G. Burton (1886–1982), American politician
- Clarence M. Burton (1853–1932), American lawyer, businessman, historian and philanthropist
