= Samuel Burton =

Samuel Burton may refer to:

- Samuel Burton (MP), 18th-century Irish MP
- Samuel S. Burton (1822–1892), American lawyer, judge, and banker in Wisconsin
- Samuel D. Burton (1887–1933), American football and basketball coach
- Samuel Burton (priest), Anglican priest
- Sam Burton (1926–2020) was an English professional footballer
- Sammy Burton, American Negro league baseball player
