= Mark Burton =

Mark Burton may refer to:

- Mark Burton (politician) (born 1956), New Zealand politician
- Mark Burton (footballer) (born 1974), New Zealand football (soccer) player
- Mark Burton (filmmaker) (born 1965), British film and television screenwriter, producer and director
- Mark Burton (bishop), Anglican Dean of Melbourne, 2009–2012
