= Elizabeth Eaton Burton =

American artist and designer

- Born: 1869; Paris, France
- Died: 1937 (aged 67–68); Los Angeles, California
- Known for: design
- Movement: Arts and Crafts
- Spouse: William W. "Billy" Burton

Elizabeth Eaton Burton (1869–1937) was an American artist and designer whose work typified the Arts and Crafts style in southern California.

== Early years ==
Elizabeth was born in Paris, France, in 1869, to Charles Frederick Eaton and Helen Justice Mitchell. Her father was an artist and designer who worked in such media as metal, glass, and leather. He taught her drawing and the rudiments of other media, which turned out to be almost the only art training she ever received. She attended boarding school in England and Germany in 1885–86. However, both Elizabeth and her mother suffered from health issues, so the family moved first to Nice and then, when Elizabeth was around 17, emigrated to the west coast of the United States, settling down near Santa Barbara, California.

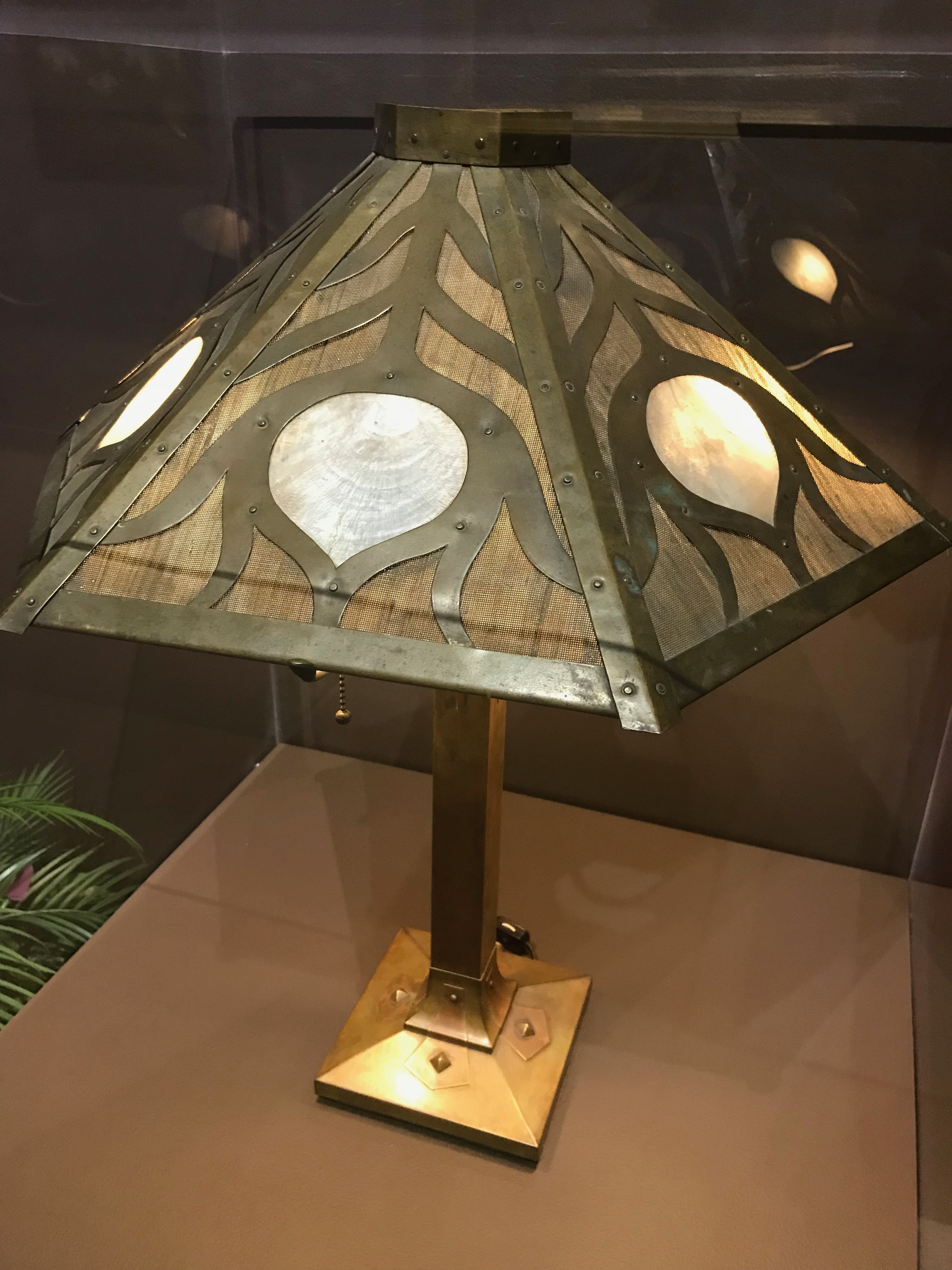
Peacock Lamp Shade circa 1910 by Elizabeth Eaton Burton.

Charles Eaton developed into a landscape architect, and the house he built for his family, Riso Rivo, in then-semi-rural Montecito featured a lotus pond with a Japanese teahouse. In an extensive scrapbook that Elizabeth kept (published in 2011), she paints a vivid picture of life in southern California, although she initially found the surroundings "in some ways primitive" compared to her family's former cosmopolitan life.

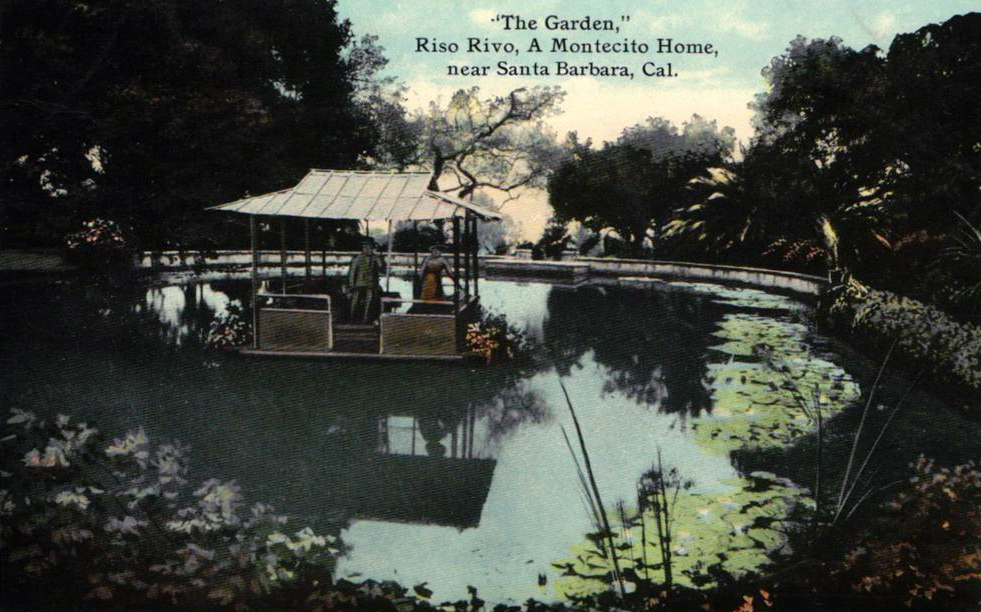
Postcard of the lotus garden and floating Japanese teahouse on the Montecito, California, estate of Riso Rivo, designed by Elizabeth Eaton Burton's father Charles Frederick Eaton.

In 1893, Burton married William W. "Billy" Burton, who was involved in real estate. They had a son (Phillip) and a daughter (Helen).

== Career ==
Burton began her career by exhibiting work at art shows and craft fairs in southern California. As her work developed, the range of media she worked in expanded until it embraced metalwork, stained glass, bookbinding, and tooled leather, as well as print media (woodcuts) and watercolor. Many of her works feature floral motifs, and there is a clear influence from Asian art in both style and subject matter that is especially evident in her prints. Typical of her work in the Arts and Crafts style are copper lamps shaped as abstract flowers with abalone shells forming the shade. Other lamps had botanical elements incorporated through repoussé techniques. One of Burton's fountains, made of copper with a koi motif, is in the lobby of the Mammoth Hotel in Yellowstone National Park.

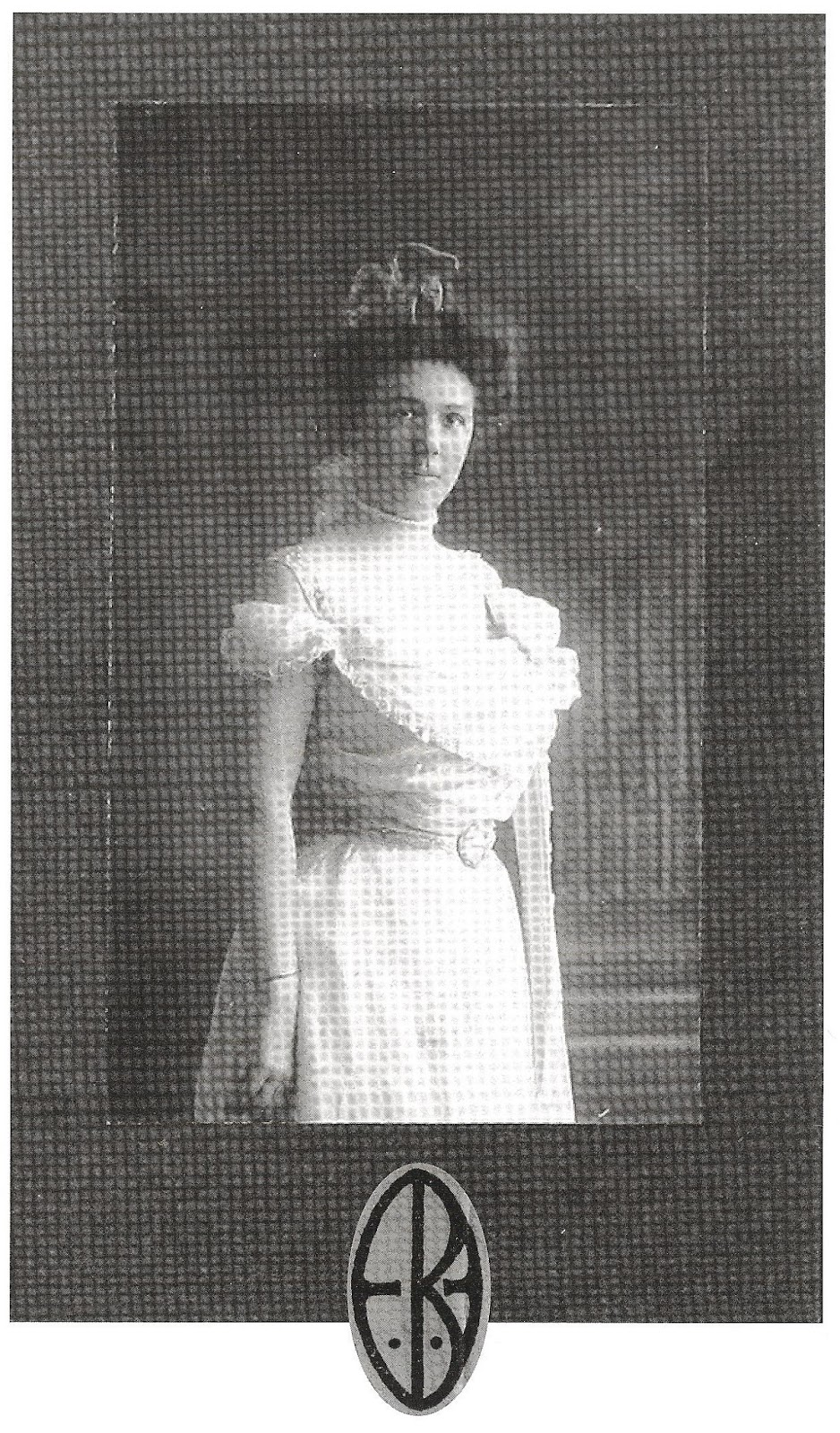
Elizabeth Eaton Burton (1901)Photograph by the painter and sculptor Frederick Remington

In 1896, Burton opened her own studio in Santa Barbara, where she specialized in decorative objects made of metal, leather, and shell. As the new century started, she was showing her work on both coasts. In 1904, both she and her father participated in the arts exhibits at the St. Louis World's Fair, with Elizabeth showing leatherwork inlaid with shell or decorated with silver leaf. She patented a technique she had developed for using ornamental leatherwork on furniture and screens, and her leather screens were praised by Gustav Stickley in his influential magazine The Craftsman.

In 1909, Burton moved her family to Los Angeles and opened a studio in the Blanchard Building. That same year she won a medal at the Alaska-Yukon-Pacific Exposition in Seattle (another event at which both she and her father both exhibited).

In 1920, Burton's husband died of a heart attack and she began a two-year world tour that included a stop in Paris for advanced art training and time in Brittany painting local scenes. When she returned to Los Angeles, she published a book about her travels, Paris Vignettes (1928).

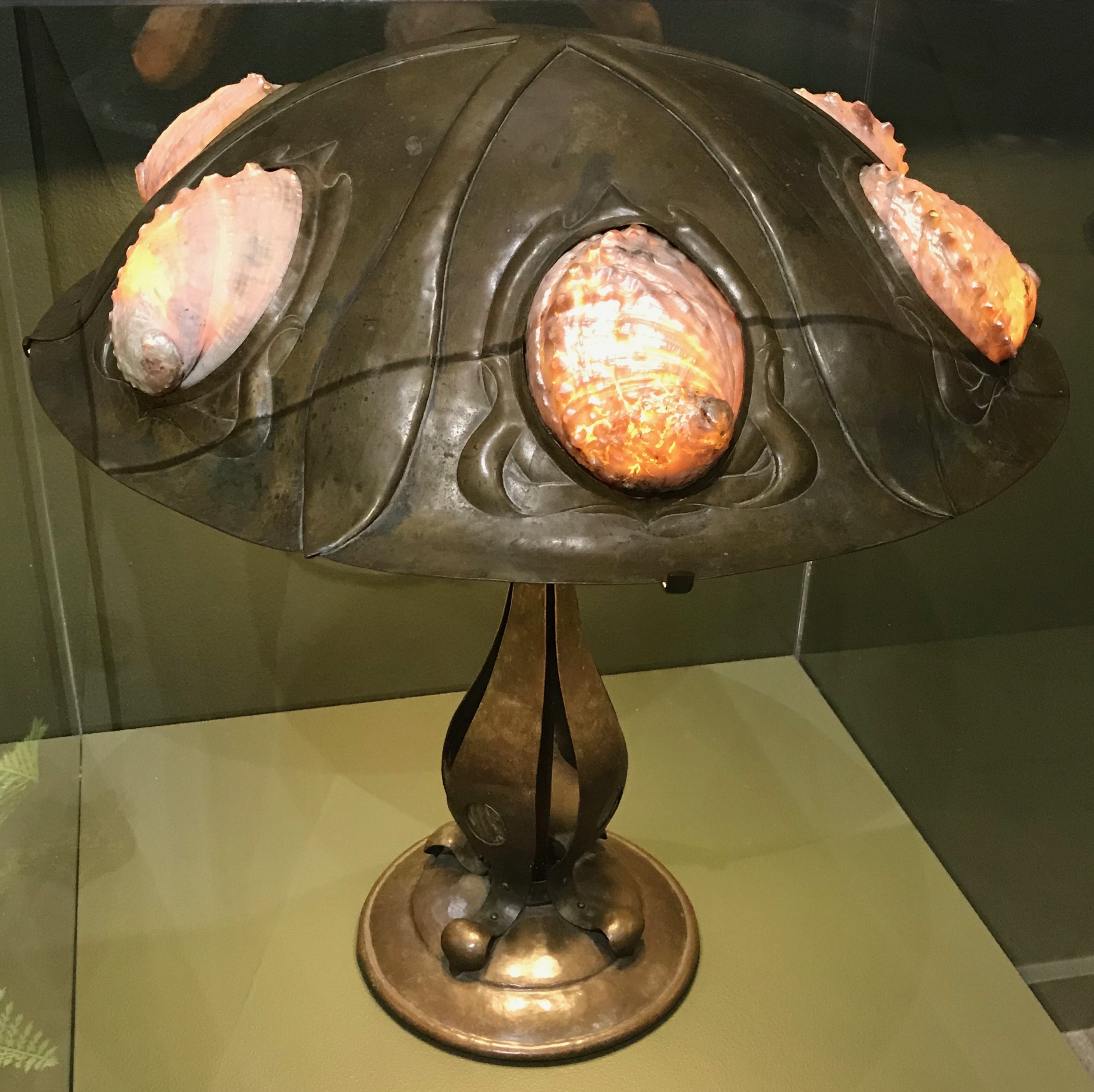
Diana circa 1908 by Elizabeth Eaton Burton.

In the 1920s, Burton was active in promoting French culture and art in California. In recognition of these efforts, she was awarded the Palme Academique in 1929 by the French government.

In 1930, following her father's death, Burton spent two more years in France, after which she went to China and Japan to paint watercolors and study woodblock printing. A number of her watercolors were published as woodblock prints by the Tokyo publisher Kato Junji and formed the core of a traveling exhibition that circled the globe in 1935–36, making stops in Beijing, Shanghai, Tokyo, Los Angeles, and New York.

Burton died in Los Angeles on November 15, 1937.
