= Walter John Burton =

New Zealand photographer (1836–1880)

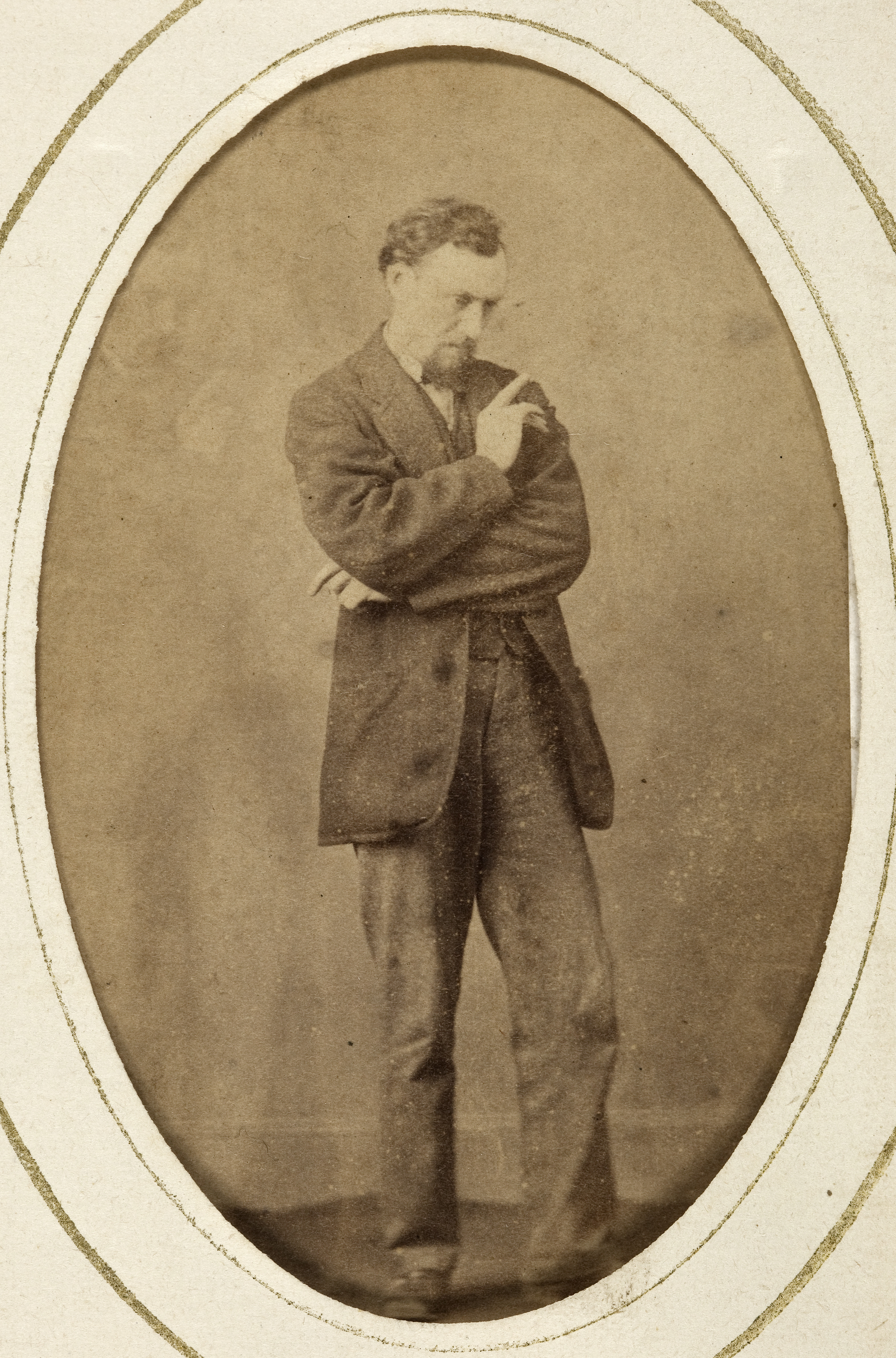
- Born: 1836; Leicester, England
- Died: 1880 (aged 43–44)
- Organization: Burton Brothers
- Style: portrait photography

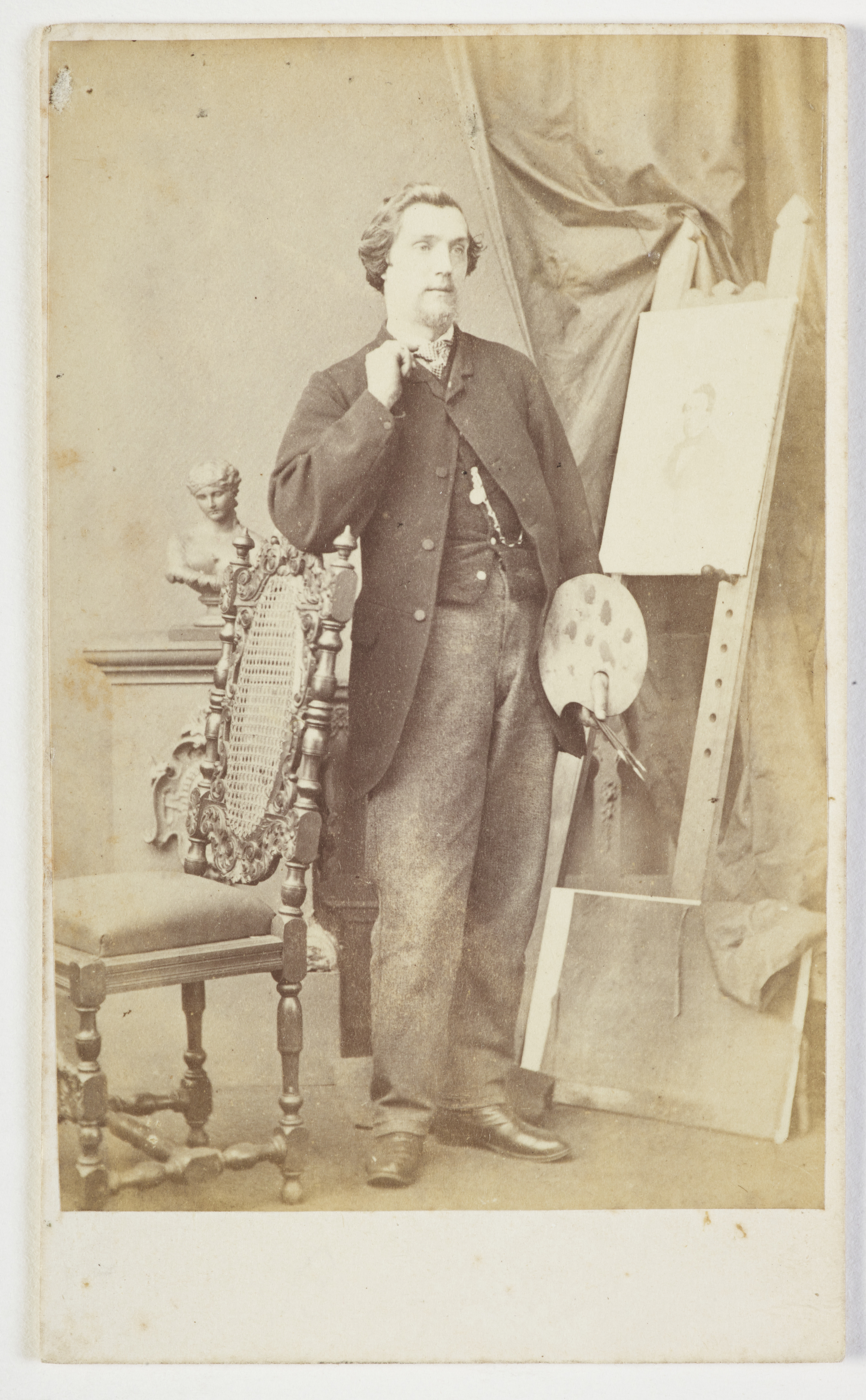
Walter Burton, circa 1866, England, by John Burton & Sons. Te Papa (O.034212)

Walter John Burton (1836–1880) was a New Zealand nineteenth-century photographer.

Burton was born in Leicester, England. His father, John Burton, was a prominent photographer and his firm John Burton and Sons was patronised by Queen Victoria and other members of the Royal Family.

Burton emigrated to New Zealand in 1866 and established a photographic studio called the Grand Photographic Saloon and Gallery in Princes Street, Dunedin. The business proved so successful that he had more work than he could handle so in 1868 he asked his brother Alfred Henry Burton to emigrate and join him in the venture.

Burton concentrated on studio portraiture while his brother travelled extensively photographing landscapes and local people. Despite their initial success, in 1877 Alfred and Walter's partnership came to an acrimonious end. Walter visited Europe to acquaint himself with new photographic developments while Alfred took over the firm.

On his return to New Zealand in 1878 Burton established another photographic studio - again in Dunedin and again focusing on studio portraiture. This business was not as successful as Burton Brothers as he often kept his customers waiting, bungled photos so that they had to be re-shot, and frequently lost his temper. He was also a heavy drinker. The business declined and in 1880, aged forty-four, he committed suicide. It is thought that he swallowed a lethal dose of potassium cyanide, a chemical used in the photographic process.

Though Burton was a fine portrait photographer but it was his brother Alfred Henry Burton's work in landscape and ethnographic studies that made the reputation of the Burton Brothers firm.
