= Bob Burton Jr. =

American speedcuber

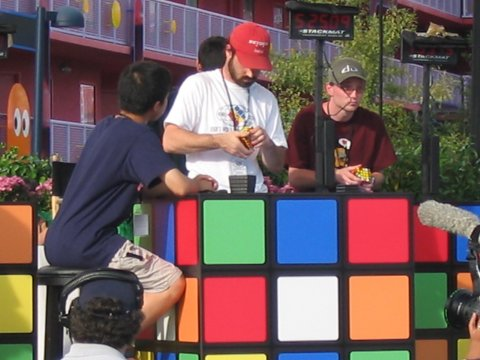
- Burton in 2005
- Born: Robert Russell Burton Jr. February 21, 1985
- Years active: 2003-2020
- Known for: Rubik's Cube speedsolving

Robert Russell Burton Jr. (born February 21, 1985) is an American speedcuber and competition organizer, best known for his world records in Rubik's Magic and Rubik's Master Magic puzzles. He has played a pivotal role in popularizing speedcubing events and organizing competitions through the World Cube Association (WCA).

Burton grew up in Kearny, New Jersey. He graduated from Kearny High School in 2003. He studied mathematics at Rutgers University in New Brunswick, New Jersey and graduated in May 2007. He rowed for the Rutgers Lightweight Crew team and was the president and founder of the Rutgers University Rubik's Cube Club. On March 14, 2015, Bob married Jaclyn Sawler in the Beyond Rubik's Cube exhibit at Liberty Science Center. He currently teaches high school mathematics in New York City.

== Rubik's Cube career ==
=== 3×3×3 cube ===
Burton began speedsolving the 3×3×3 Rubik's Cube in May 2001. He was first challenged by some of his friends in an informal competition to see who could solve one side the fastest and was consistently the last to finish, so he bought a Rubik's Cube and began to practice with it. He was able to solve the cube in under a minute within a few months using the layer by layer method. He competed in the 2003 Rubik's World Games Championships.

=== Rubik's Magic ===
Burton was one of the pioneers of solving the Rubik's Magic in the United States. After learning how to solve the puzzle, he insisted on it being an official event in competitions. Ian Winokur allowed a Rubik's Magic competition at the Horace Mann Spring 2005 tournament, in which Burton broke the American record for single solve (1.56 seconds) and average of five (1.85 seconds). In his next competition, Burton also insisted on allowing the Rubik's Master Magic to be an event. Tyson Mao agreed, so in the Caltech Summer 2005 competition, Burton set the single solve world record for the Rubik's Magic (1.28 seconds) and the single solve (3.05 seconds) and average of five (3.54 seconds) world records for the Rubik's Master Magic. At the Trumbull Spring 2006 tournament, he also broke the world record for Rubik's Magic average (1.40 seconds). He was the national champion in 2006 for the Rubik's Magic and the Rubik's Master Magic.

=== Rubik's Clock ===
At the 2005 Dutch Open Championship, Burton set the American record for the Rubik's Clock for single solve (24.12 seconds) and mean (32.68 seconds).

=== Other puzzles ===
Burton was the national champion at the 2006 US National Championships in San Francisco for the Square-1. He is also credited with creating a method for the Pyraminx, known as the “Bob Burton Method.”

=== 3×3×3 one-handed ===
Burton also practiced the 3×3×3 one-handed event. He was among the best in the world, placing 5th overall (of 61) in the first round of the 2005 Rubik's Cube World Championship.

=== 3×3×3 blindfolded ===
In May 2006, Burton successfully solved the Rubik's Cube blindfolded in an official competition at the Trumbull Spring 2006 tournament in a time of 6 minutes 21.87 seconds. He had failed his first ten attempts before that, dating back to May of the previous year. Burton uses the Pochmann method to solve a cube blindfolded, which solves one piece at a time through a series of commutators.

=== Official competition times ===
Burton's best official solves:

Event	Single Solve	Average
3×3×3	13.15	16.71
2×2×2	1.84	6.13
4×4×4	1:27.81	1:40.54
5×5×5	3:00.63	3:34.55
6×6×6	13:35.00	n/a
7×7×7	18:43.00	n/a
3×3×3 blindfolded	3:04.41	4:14.35
Fewest moves challenge	31 moves	38.00
3×3×3 one-handed	25.28	31.70
Clock	11.21	13.99
Megaminx	5:08.22	6:21.75
Pyraminx	7.63	13.33
Skewb	12.76	19.73
Square-1	54.38	1:15.42
Rubik's Magic	1.17	1.29
Rubik's Master Magic	2.90	3.15
