= Elizabeth Favill =

Elizabeth Favill (baptised 1795, died 1862), also known by her married name Elizabeth Burton, and known professionally as Jane, was chief cook and manager of Bellamy's Refreshment Rooms in the House of Commons, and immortalised by Charles Dickens.

== Biography ==
Favill was baptised in Lincoln in 1795. She came to work in Bellamy's as resident chief cook in 1817.

In 1820 Favill married Samuel Burton, a waiter at Bellamy's between 1819 and 1829. The marriage was not successful. Her manager, John Bellamy junior, left her £20 in his will written in 1837, with the stipulation this was not to be used for the debts of her husband or controlled by him. A married woman's property belonged to her husband before the Married Women's Property Acts. Perhaps for this reason, Favill continued to appear in Bellamy's records as Elizabeth Favill rather than Burton. Samuel Burton died in 1839.

By 1834 Favill's salary was £28 a year. She was one of six Bellamy's staff living and working in the Palace of Westminster at the time of the Burning of Parliament in October 1834. They escaped with the loss of their uniforms, and began living and working again in a temporary building soon afterwards. Bellamy's continued to operate as the new Palace of Westminster was built around it. By this time it was acknowledged by John Bellamy that Favill was largely responsible for running the establishment.

In June 1848 Favill wrote to Thomas Greene MP, Chief Commissioner for completing the new Palace of Westminster, via her then manager, Edmund Bellamy. She recommended a single kitchen so that all the work might be done under the eye of ‘one responsible person’, plus a room for a laundry and for roasting and chopping vegetables. There should be two stoves in the kitchen so MPs would not be kept waiting, and a fire-place was required for a gridiron to dress chops and steaks. The authorities did not take her advice, instead deciding that the Commons should introduce fine dining.

Nicholas Keynes retired around 1849, and Favill became manager of Bellamy's, now with the title Resident Housekeeper of the House of Commons Refreshment Rooms. She continued to serve beer, chops and steaks until Bellamy's closed in August 1851. By this time, as 'Jane', she was a well-known parliamentary character whose deeds and sayings were often reported by the press. She died in 1862.

== Portrayal by Dickens as 'Jane' ==
In 1835 the writer Charles Dickens described Bellamy's in a parliamentary sketch published in Sketches by Boz. He featured two of its staff: 'Old Nicholas' (Nicholas Keynes, 'as completely a part of the building as the house itself') and Elizabeth Favill, called 'Jane', and described by Dickens as Hebe, the Ancient Greek goddess of youth:

That female in black... is ‘Jane:’ the Hebe of Bellamy's. Jane is as great a character as Nicholas, in her way. Her leading features are a thorough contempt for the great majority of her visitors; her predominant quality, love of admiration, as you cannot fail to observe, if you mark the glee with which she listens to something the young Member near her mutters somewhat unintelligibly in her ear (for his speech is rather thick from some cause or other), and how playfully she digs the handle of a fork into the arm with which he detains her, by way of reply. Jane is no bad hand at repartees, and showers them about, with a degree of liberality and total absence of reserve or constraint, which occasionally excites no small amazement in the minds of strangers. She cuts jokes with Nicholas, too, but looks up to him with a great deal of respect — the immovable stolidity with which Nicholas receives the aforesaid jokes, and looks on, at certain pastoral friskings and rompings (Jane's only recreations, and they are very innocent too) which occasionally take place in the passage, is not the least amusing part of his character.

It was usual for female staff at Bellamy's to be known by pseudonyms, possibly to hide their true identities from familiar customers. Other women had previously been known as Jane, but by 1835 this title had passed to Favill.

It was reported in the press after Bellamy's closed that Jane was still seen about the new Houses of Parliament; 'no longer a Hebe, but fat and forty; yet still sure of kindly nods from the old members when she happens to meet them’.

== See also ==
- Jane Julia Bennett, Housekeeper of the House of Lords
