= Jean Winder =

British parliamentary reporter (1909–2006)

Florence "Jean" May Winder (1909-2006) (née Hayward) was the first woman to hold a permanent post as a parliamentary reporter for Hansard, the official record of debate in the Houses of Parliament in the UK. Appointed in 1944, she pushed for equal pay for women reporters and achieved this in 1953. She then became the first woman to make a speech at a Press Gallery dinner. She retired in 1960.

== Early life ==
Florence May Hayward, known as "Jean", was born in Stockwell, London on 23 April 1907. Her parents managed pubs around south London until her father's death in 1913. Hayward trained as a secretary at Hettie Craig-Kelly's secretarial college in Moorgate, London. Craig-Kelly picked Hayward to accompany her as official verbatim reporters on the Royal Commission to the West Indies with the Moyne Commission in 1938–9. Craig-Kelly and Hayward were thanked in the report of the Moyne Commission as reporters ‘who carried out their duties under most difficult conditions’.

Hayward married Lieutenant Ralph Spearing Winder on 4 October 1940 in London but was widowed when he died on active service in 1941.

== Parliamentary career ==
On 18 January 1944, Jean Winder was appointed as a temporary reporter for the House of Commons' Hansard. The editor, Percy Cole, made it clear he had only appointed a woman as there were no men available. The following year, in November 1945, she was made permanent, with Cole admitting she was a "capable and efficient" reporter. By 1947, he was citing her as an example of good work when giving evidence to a Select Committee. Winston Churchill described her as "a shorthand writer's dream".

Her initial salary, in 1944, was £400. After becoming permanent, she was placed on a salary scale of £450-600. The equivalent men's salary was £560-700. From 1951, when she had reached the top of her scale, she campaigned to receive equal pay to the men. She wrote to the Chancellor of the Exchequer, Hugh Gaitskell, about this in January 1951. She was supported in her campaign by Douglas Clifton-Brown as Speaker of the House of Commons and Irene Ward. The latter raised Winder's case in the House of Commons in a debate on Equal Pay in 1951 as well as writing many letters demanding equal pay. Charles Pannell also mentioned a woman Hansard reporter 'doing exactly the same work, who does not receive the rate for the job' in the House of Commons during an equal pay debate in 1952.

The Treasury, who set the pay scales, finally equalised Winder's pay with the men in 1953. Winder resigned from the House of Commons in 1960, just before remarrying, and there were no further women reporters for Hansard until 1968.

== Later life ==
On 14 May 1960, Winder married Jack Hawke, the parliamentary correspondent for the Daily Telegraph and chairman of the Parliamentary Press Gallery. On Hawke's retirement, the couple moved to Devon. Hawke died in 1998, and Winder died of old age on 26 December 2005 in Dawlish.

== See also ==
- Ellen Baylis, first permanent woman Parliamentary Press Gallery reporter
- Kay Midwinter, first woman Clerk in the House of Commons
