= Charles K. Barton =

American politician (1886–1958)

Member of the New Jersey Senate from the Passaic district
- In office 1943–1948
- Preceded by: Oscar R. Wilensky
- Succeeded by: Vincent E. Hull

Personal details
- Born: August 16, 1886 Paterson, New Jersey
- Died: January 25, 1958 (aged 71) Paterson, New Jersey
- Party: Republican

Charles King Barton (August 16, 1886 – January 25, 1958) was an American politician who served in the New Jersey Senate from 1943 to 1948.

Barton was born in Paterson, New Jersey, the youngest of seven children of a silk dyer. He attended schools in Paterson before enrolling at the Columbia College of Physicians and Surgeons. After abandoning his medical studies he graduated from New York Law School in 1908 and passed the bar examination in 1910.

In his first role as a public official, Barton was appointed attorney in Passaic County's Deeds and Mortgages Office. He was president of the Paterson Board of Education from 1940 to 1943 and was a member of the city's Board of Finance from 1943 to 1947.

In 1943, he was elected as a Republican state senator from Passaic County. He became majority leader for the New Jersey Senate in 1946 and president in 1947. He served as acting governor for one month in 1947 when Governor Alfred E. Driscoll was on vacation.

Barton played a key role in the reorganization of the state court system adopted under the 1947 state constitution. After stepping down from the Senate in 1948, he was appointed the first Clerk to the Supreme Court of New Jersey under the new system.

Barton married Elizabeth Currie in 1912 and had two daughters and one son. He died in Paterson General Hospital on January 25, 1958, at the age of 71 after suffering a cerebral hemorrhage.
