= Robert Burton (American politician) =

American politician

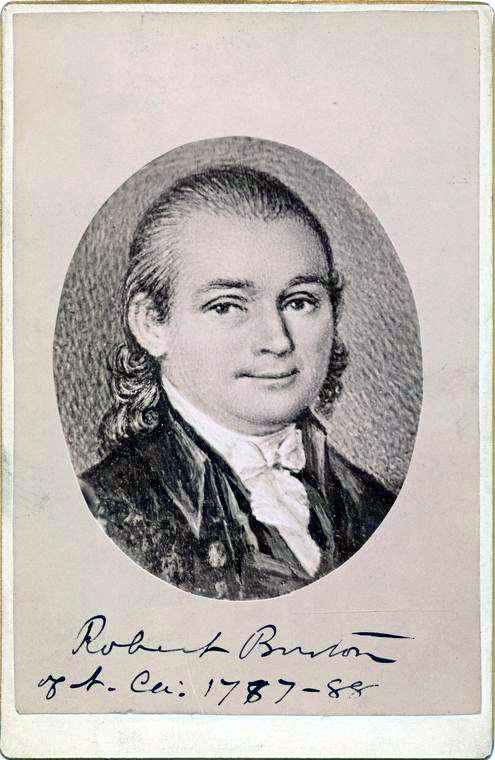
- Robert Buron
- Born: October 20, 1747; Goochland County, Virginia
- Died: May 31, 1825 (aged 77); Vance County, North Carolina
- Burial place: Montpelier Plantation Cemetery, Williamsboro, North Carolina
- Spouse: Agatha Williams
- Children: Nine
- Military career
- Allegiance: United States of America
- Branch: North Carolina militia, Continental Army
- Service years: 1780-1782
- Rank: Colonel
- Units: Virginia Continental Line, Granville County Regiment
- Commands: Assistant Deputy Quartermaster General, Halifax and Hillsborough District Brigades

Robert Burton (October 20, 1747 – May 31, 1825) was an American farmer, Revolutionary War officer, and planter in what is now Vance County, North Carolina (then Granville County, North Carolina). He was a delegate from North Carolina to the Continental Congress in 1787. Between 1783 and 1815, the North Carolina General Assembly elected him to 13 one-year terms on the Council of State, which at the time was an official advisory panel that the legislature used to check the governor's power.

== Early life and career ==
Robert Burton was born in Goochland County, Colony of Virginia on October 20, 1747. He was the son of Tabitha Minge and Hutchings Burton and may also have been the grandson of Noel Burton, barrister of Henrico County, Virginia. He moved to Granville County, North Carolina in about 1775 where he married Agatha Williams, daughter of Judge John Williams.

== Military service ==
Military service record:

- Before 1780, a Lieutenant in the Virginia Continental Line
- Colonel, Granville County Regiment (1780 – 1782)
- 1780, Assistant Deputy Quartermaster General and Commissary over Hillsborough and Halifax Districts.
- Stationed at Nutbush/Williamsboro in Granville County (currently Vance County, North Carolina)

Burton was the uncle of Governor Hutchins G. Burton.
