= Frederick Burton =

Frederick or Fred Burton may refer to:

- Frederick Burton (actor) (1871–1957), American actor
- Frederick Burton (alpine skier) (born 1959), British former alpine skier
- Frederick Burton (Australian cricketer) (1865–1929), Australian wicket-keeper
- Frederick Burton (English cricketer) (1885–1978), English cricketer
- Frederic William Burton (1816–1900), Irish painter
- Fred Burton (footballer) (1918–1997), Australian rules footballer
- Fred Burton (security expert), expert on security, terrorists and terrorist organizations
