= Bellamy's (UK Parliament catering facility) =

Bellamy's (or Bellamys) was the first official catering facility for the UK House of Commons, founded by John Bellamy in 1773.

== History ==
John Bellamy was the Deputy Housekeeper of the House of Commons and was asked by MPs to provide refreshments in-house in 1773. Before this date, MPs had to go out of the Palace of Westminster to nearby taverns and coffee-houses, or have food brought in specially.

In 1792 Bellamy's is first named in records, as a place where 'the members, who cannot say more than yes or no below, can speechify for hours to Mother Bellamy about beef steaks and pork chops.' Mother Bellamy was John's wife, Elizabeth Bellamy.

In 1811 John Bellamy retired and his son, also John Bellamy, took over as Deputy Housekeeper. He ran the refreshment rooms jointly with his wife, Susan Maria, until her death in 1832. Bellamy's appears in a parliamentary guide in the 1820s, with the menu including rump steaks, mutton chops, veal pasties, roast and boiled beef, pickles and Stilton cheese, plus wine, porter, coffee and beer.

John Bellamy junior, his family and servants were resident in the Palace of Westminster at the Burning of Parliament in 1834. They escaped from the fire but lost all their possessions. Bellamy's quickly set up in temporary buildings and continued to provide catering services.

In 1842 John Bellamy junior retired and his post was split in two. The role of Deputy Housekeeper was given to Wilbraham Taylor, son-in-law of Sir William Gosset, the Serjeant at Arms. The refreshment rooms were taken over by John's son Edmund Bellamy, until his death in 1849. George Woodhouse, previously steward to the Duke of Beaufort, was then given the catering contract, with the aim of introducing fine dining facilities, as already existed in the House of Lords.

Bellamy's was closed in 1851, its staff lost their jobs, and its fixtures and fittings were auctioned off.

== Cultural references ==
Bellamy's is most famous for William Pitt the Younger's alleged last words on his deathbed in 1806, “I think I could eat one of Bellamy’s veal pies.” However this story is unlikely to be true. It was not published until 1891, in Lord Rosebery's biography of Pitt. Rosebery had been told the story by Benjamin Disraeli, who had been told it by a waiter, perhaps keen to encourage customers. The anecdote nevertheless demonstrates how well-known Bellamy's was to MPs for decades, even after its closure.

Bellamy's was immortalised by Charles Dickens in 1835. Dickens reported on parliamentary proceedings for his uncle's paper, the Mirror of Parliament. Dickens wrote a parliamentary sketch published in Sketches by Boz describing Bellamy's kitchen as a place where politicians met doorkeepers and messengers. He featured two prominent staff, 'Old Nicholas' (Nicholas Keynes, the butler and manager) and 'Jane' (the pseudonym of Elizabeth Burton, née Favill, head cook).

== Legacy ==
The name Bellamy's was adopted by the New Zealand Parliament for its catering facility in 1854.

In the UK Parliament, George Woodhouse lost the catering contract and was replaced by Mr Steers in 1853. In 1863 the House of Commons assumed direct control over catering facilities and employed its own manager and staff, and has done ever since.

In 1991 the House of Commons named a cafeteria in 1 Parliament Street 'Bellamy's'. It is described by an MPs' staff website today as light and airy, and known for its excellent curries. A nearby bar was also called Bellamy's Bar, however this and an adjacent room, the Astor Suite, were closed in 2010 so the space could be used for the new House of Commons Nursery.

In 2023 the House of Commons celebrated '250 years of catering', dating back to the founding of Bellamy's in 1773.
