= Margaret E. Burton =

American missionary (1885–1969)

Margaret Ernestine Burton (1885–1969) was an American missionary who traveled to China and Japan in 1909. She wrote several books based on her experiences and research while there.

Burton was born in Massachusetts to a Baptist pastor and teacher. When her father was sent to a work-related journey to the Far East, Margaret travelled with him to look at women’s education there. When she returned to the US she wrote several books on the subject. She was committed to women’s education and advocated a holistic position on the relationship between evangelism and education. She was a member of the Board of Education of the Northern Baptist Convention as well as the Executive Board of the Association for Adult Education and the Department of Education; she was also heavily involved in the YMCA. She returned to China in 1921 as a member of the China Education Commission.

== Selected works ==
- The Education of Women in China (1911)
- Notable Women of Modern China (1912)
- The Education of Women in Japan (1914)
- Comrades in Service (1916)
- Women workers of the Orient (1918)
- New Paths for old purposes (1927)
- Mabel Cratty (1929)
