= Katherine Burton =

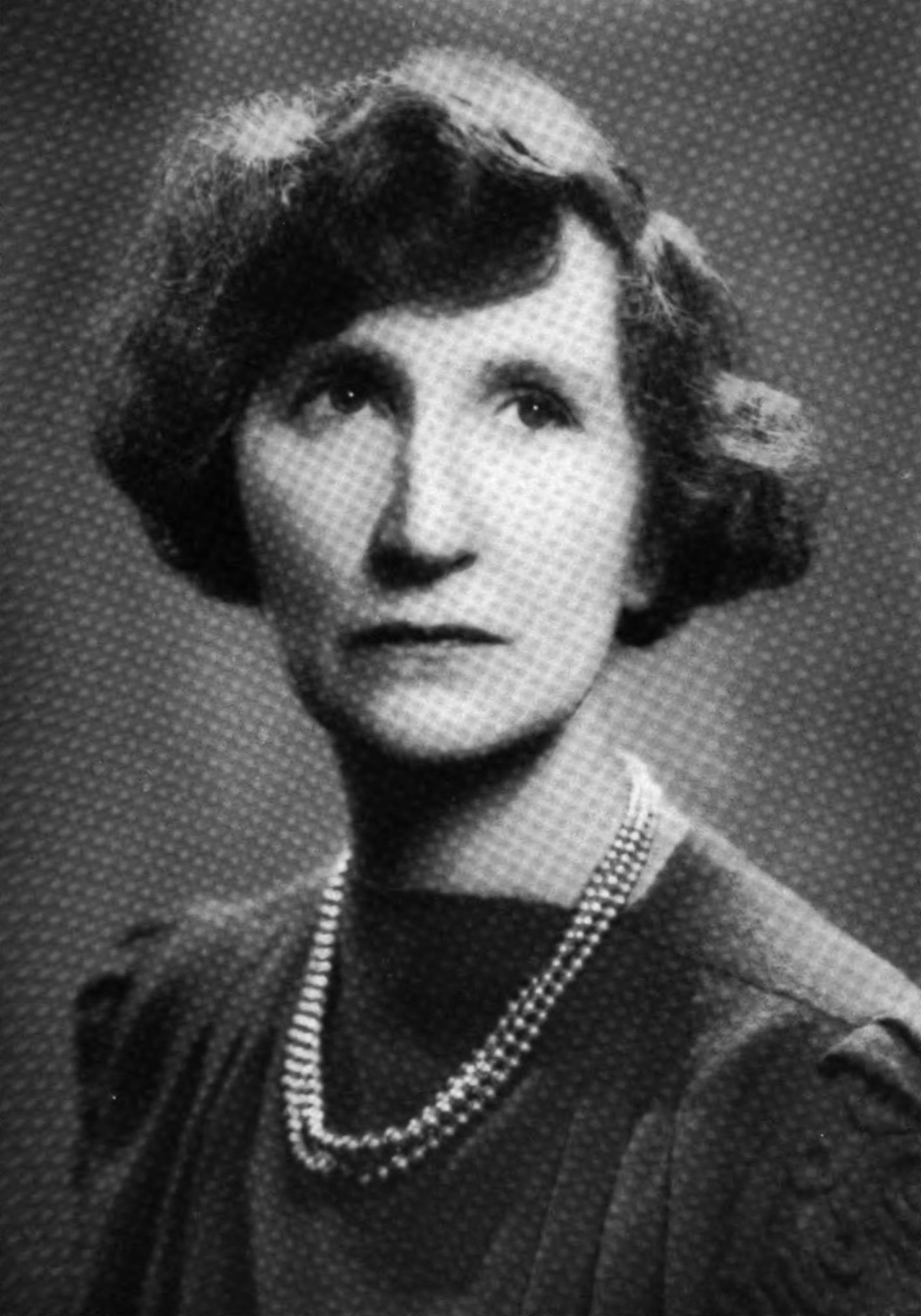
- Born: March 18, 1887
- Died: September 22, 1969 (aged 82)
- Occupations: Writer and social activist

Signature
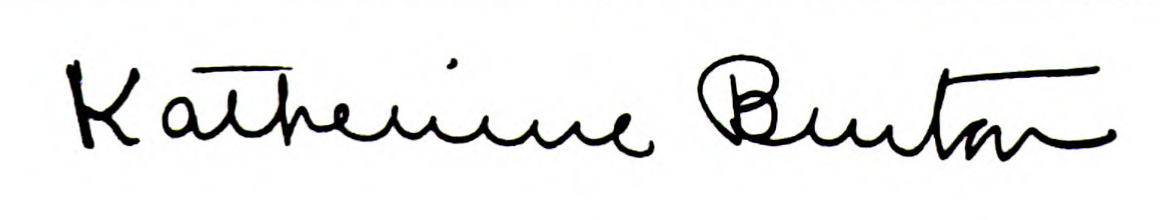

Katherine Burton (born Katherine Kurz; March 18, 1887, in Lakewood, near Cleveland, Ohio; died September 22, 1969) was an American Roman Catholic convert who became renowned in her post-conversion years as a religious biographer. She was also a prominent social activist campaigning for family rights, a poet and a short story writer. She was the first woman columnist in a Catholic journal.

== Early years ==
Burton was originally the daughter of a German Lutheran family who rarely went to church. Apart from Sunday School it is thought that in her childhood she had little interest in religion. She graduated in 1909 from Western Reserve College. At that time she considered herself an agnostic and never attended religious services, even after her marriage (August 6, 1910) to Harry Payne Burton, a journalist who had originally intended to become an Episcopal priest. Harry was to have considerable trouble during his marriage - which produced three children - eventually committing suicide April 3, 1952.

== Conversion to Catholicism ==
During the following decade, she travelled frequently, in the process coming into contact with Selden Delany, the assistant rector at an Episcopal Church in New York City, who was to lead her journey to Catholicism in the coming years. Delany, who died in 1935, converted to Catholicism in the late 1920s and his book Why Rome?, published in 1930, convinced Katherine to convert immediately. She was received into the Church on September 8, 1930, but even before that she wrote two poems, "So Died a True Christian" and "A Prayer for Ronald" (both 1927) that had a strongly Catholic flavour.

== After conversion ==
Along with her close friend and fellow convert Dorothy Day, Burton was the first major Catholic woman journalist in the United States. In 1933, at the same time as Day established the Catholic Worker, Burton wrote a journal, Woman, that was published by the Passionist Fathers and advocated motherhood as the greatest possible vocation at a time when it was becoming very difficult for women to raise children due to economic conditions. On the other hand, Burton believed that women should be aided as much as possible if they were forced to seek paid employment outside the home. Katherine Burton in fact believed that balancing work and family was an extremely rich reward for any woman who could do so. Like Day, Katherine Burton was initially a pacifist, but in contrast to Day's consistent stance, Burton relented from pacifism during World War II because she feared the result of the spread of totalitarianism if the US did nothing about it.

Burton was, even before her conversion, interested in the problems women faced with large families, and even before it became the only method of birth control approved by the Church, she was a developer and advocate of the rhythm method of contraception, having known about the fertile and infertile periods of the menstrual cycle ever since her days at college during the 1900s. She also believed that most Roman Catholic writers of her time were stylistically flawed because they were "too arrogant and preachy", with the result that she wrote biographies that read more like fiction.

During this time, she was also an associate editor at Redbook magazine and wrote a column for a Catholic periodical.

She died September 22, 1969 in Bronxville, New York, and is buried in Cleveland, Ohio.

== Books ==
- Sorrow Built a Bridge: A Daughter of Hawthorne (1937)
- Paradise Planters; the story of Brook Farm (1939), Longmans, Green and Company
- His dear persuasion; the life of Elizabeth Ann Seton (1940)
- In No Strange Land (1942)
- Brother André of Mount-Royal (1942)
- Celestial Homespun: The Life of Isaac Thomas Hecker (1943), Longmans, Green and Company
- No Shadow of Turning. The life of James Kent Stone - Father Fidelis of the Cross. With a portrait (1944), Longmans Green and Company
- Mother Butler of Marymount (1944)
- Burton, Katherine (1946). According to the Pattern; The Story of Dr Agnes McLaren and the Society of Catholic Medical Missionaries. New York: Longmans, Green. OCLC 717114660.
- Three Generations (1947)
- The Next Thing: Autobiography and Reminiscences (1949)
- Chaminade, apostle of Mary (1949)
- Where There is Love (1951)
- The Table of the King: The Sisters of Charity of Providence (1952)
- Whom Love Impels (1952)
- The Great Mantle (1954)
  - a biography of Giuseppe Sarto (Pope Pius X)
- Paradise Planters (1956)
- My Beloved to Me (1956)
- Witness of the Light (1958)
  - a biography of Pope Pius XII
- With God and Two Ducats (1958)
- Lily and Sword and Crown: The History of the Congregation of the Sisters of St. Casimir, 1907-1957 (1958)
- Make the way known; the history of the Dominican Congregation of St. Mary of the Springs, 1822 to 1957 (1959)
- Faith is the substance; the life of Mother Theodore Guerin, foundress of the Sisters of Providence of Saint Mary-of-the Woods, Indiana. (1959)
- The Dream Lives Forever (1960)
- Woman to Woman (1961)
- The Golden Door; the life of Katharine Drexel (1957) P. J. Kennedy and Sons, New York
- Valiant Voyager (1964)
- The Bernardines (1964)
- Bells on Two Rivers (1965)
- The Feast Day Cookbook (2005 Reprint)
  - written with Helmut Ripperger
- The Eighth American Saint (2006 Reprint)
- Mightily and Sweetly (2007, 2008 Reprint)
- A Memoir of Mrs. Crudelius (2010 Reprint)
- One Thing Needful: The Biography Of Mother Franziska Lechner, Foundress Of The Daughters Of Divine Charity (2011 Reprint)

== Sources and further reading ==
- Kroeger, Rebecca L. (2001). "Katherine Burton (1884?-1969)". In Reichardt, Mary R. (ed.). Catholic Women Writers: a Bio-Bibliographical Sourcebook. Westport, Conn.: Greenwood Press. pp. 18–22. ISBN 9780313311475. OCLC 237509257 – via Google Books.
- Allitt, Patrick (1997). Catholic Converts: British and American Intellectuals Turn to Rome. Ithaca: Cornell University Press. pp. 127, 152–154. ISBN 9781501720536. OCLC 645798516 – via Google Books.
- Downs, Winfield Scott, ed. (1941). "Burton, Katherine, author, editor". Encyclopedia of American Biography: New Series. Vol. 12. American Historical Society. pp. 252–253. OCLC 649569887 – via HathiTrust.
