= 2005 Rubik's Cube World Championship =

Mechanical puzzle solving contest

Tournament information
- Sport: Speedcubing
- Location: Lake Buena Vista, Florida, United States
- Date: 5–6 November 2005
- Host: United States
- Venue: Disney's Pop Century Resort

Final positions
- 1st runner-up: Edouard Chambon
- 2nd runner-up: Shotaro Makisumi

Final champion
- Jean Pons

The 2005 World Speedcubing Championships was a speedcubing competition held on November 5–6, 2005. A total of 149 competitors from around the world participated in the event. The third edition of the event, it was the first to be organized by the World Cube Association (WCA), which was founded in 2004 with its co-founders Tyson Mao and Ron van Bruchem serving as delegates. The competition was held to commemorate the 25th anniversary of the Rubik's brand and the launch of the worldwide sales of the Rubik's Cube.

Athletes competed in 15 disciplines. Compared to the previous championship, two new disciplines were introduced—the 2x2 cube and the 3x3x3 legged cube —while Pyraminx was absent, as it was not included among the official WCA disciplines when it was formed.

== Organization ==
The 2003 World Championships in Toronto signaled a renewed public interest in mechanical puzzles. The competition's regulations laid the foundation for the creation of uniform rules for the sport, and through the international online community "Speedsolvingrubikscube," several national competitions and a European Championship were organized in 2003 and 2004. In August 2004, community activists founded the World Cube Association, and a few months later, the rules of speedcubing were codified. A decision was made to hold World Championships regularly in odd-numbered years.

The 2005 championship was held in Lake Buena Vista, town adjacent to Orlando that, with a permanent population of approximately 10 people, is entirely comprised of the Walt Disney World resort and entertainment complex. The competition was held at one of the resort's four theme parks, Disney's Pop Century Resort. This complex, which opened in 2003, is dedicated to American pop culture, and one of its hotel areas is decorated with six Rubik's Cube-shaped art objects the size of a four-story building. Local speedcubing competitions have already been held on its grounds.. Many athletes found the large sign "POP" (one of the meanings in English is "pop, emission, flash") at the entrance to the complex's territory, denoting its name, amusing, since in speedcuber jargon this word refers to a situation in which puzzle pieces unexpectedly fly out during rapid assembly.

A legal dispute arose involving the British company Seven Towns (the copyright holder of the Rubik's brand ), which was the co-organizer and general sponsor of the competition. In 2005, Rubik's main competitor in the mechanical puzzle market was the Taiwanese company East Sheen, and many speedcubers preferred Taiwanese cubes as being more convenient for speed solving. A Seven Towns representative stated that they do not intend to "support companies like East Sheen, who trade on our efforts." The Federation was forced to agree, and puzzles from all brands except Rubik's were banned from the World Championship.

On the first day of the competition, November 5, 2005, the opening rounds of the multi-round events were held. On the second day, the finals of the multi-round events were held, as well as the only rounds of the single-round events. In the evening, following the awards ceremony, a party was held for the participants in the France pavilion of the neighboring Epcot theme park. The total prize fund for the championship, provided by the sponsor, was $19,550, of which the top prize of $5,000 was awarded to the champion in the 3x3x3 cube event. In addition, all winners received a commemorative trophy in honor of the 25th anniversary of the Rubik's brand.

== Регламент ==
The competition was held according to the general rules of the WCA in the version of September 23, 2005. The participation regulations were as follows:

- In the 3x3x3 discipline, the competition was held in three stages. All registered athletes participated in the first round, each making three attempts, with the best time counting. The top 36 participants advanced to the second round, and the top 12 participants from the second round advanced to the final. In the second round and final, each participant made 5 attempts, with the average truncated time being counted.
- In the disciplines 4×4×4, 5×5×5, 3×3×3 one-handed, 3×3×3 blindfold, Rubik's clock and Squier-1 the competition was held in 2 stages: qualifying according to the “best of 2 attempts” (Bo2) scheme final according to the scheme "arithmetic mean of 3", (Mo3) except for 3x3x3 blindfold, where the final was held according to the Bo2 format.
- In the 2x2x2 and Rubik's Magic disciplines, the competition was held in two stages: the first stage was held according to the Bo2 and Bo3 schemes, respectively, and the final stage was held according to the Ao5 scheme.
- In the disciplines 3x3x3 by number of moves, 3x3x3 by legs and megaminx, the competition was held in 2 stages, in each of which the athletes made one attempt.
- In the remaining disciplines, the competition was held in 1 stage according to the Bo2 scheme (except for megaminx, where participants made 1 attempt).

All solves were entered into the database as single attempts, and for the finals of the 2x2x2, 3x3x3, and Rubik's Magic disciplines, the average time was also taken into account. Furthermore, although in the 4x4x4, 5x5x5, 3x3x3 one-handed, Rubik's Clock, and Square-1 disciplines, according to the rules in effect since 2006, the qualifying time should be calculated as the truncated mean Ao5, the arithmetic mean Mo3 recorded at the championship was also taken into account and entered into the database due to the insignificant differences in the regulations.

== Results ==
=== 3x3x3 ===
Place	Name	Average	Status	Country	Attempt 1	Attempt 2	Attempt 3	Attempt 4	Attempt 5
Average of 5
1	Jean Pons	15.10	ER	France	15.62	15.87	13.00	13.81	18.59
2	Edouard Chambon	16.00		France	14.90	17.21	15.89	18.03	14.04
3	Shotaro Makisumi	16.07		Japan	14.60	18.58	16.30	15.65	16.26
