= Mátyás Kuti =

Hungarian Rubik's cube speedsolver

Mátyás Kuti is a Hungarian Rubik's Cube and Rubik's Magic solver. During 2007 and 2008 he held world records in many events. However, in February 2008, after determining that he had cheated in blindfolded events by peeking at the cube, the World Cube Association revoked all of his blindfold records and banned him for three years from WCA competitions.

== World records formerly held ==
- Rubik's Magic Single
- Rubik's Magic Average
- Master Magic Single
- Master Magic Average
- 2x2x2 Cube Single
- 2x2x2 Cube Average
- 4x4x4 Cube Single
- 4x4x4 Cube Average
- 5x5x5 Cube Single
- 5x5x5 Cube Average
- Square One Average
- Rubik's Clock Average
