= Sebastian Weyer =

German Rubik's Cube speedsolver

- Born: 4 December 1997 (age 28)
- Known for: Rubik's Cube speedsolving
Medal record
Representing Germany
Speedcubing
WCA World Championship
Event	1st	2nd	3rd
3x3x3	0	0	2
4x4x4	2	2	0
Total	2	2	2
Gold medal – first place	2017 Paris	4x4x4
Gold medal – first place	2025 Seattle	4x4x4
Silver medal – second place	2013 Las Vegas	4x4x4
Silver medal – second place	2019 Melbourne	4x4x4
Bronze medal – third place	2013 Las Vegas	3x3x3
Bronze medal – third place	2019 Melbourne	3x3x3
European Championship
Event	1st	2nd	3rd
3x3x3	0	1	1
4x4x4	3	0	0
5x5x5	0	2	0
Megaminx	0	0	1
Total	3	3	2
Gold medal – first place	2014 Roskilde	4x4x4
Gold medal – first place	2016 Prague	4x4x4
Gold medal – first place	2018 Madrid	4x4x4
Silver medal – second place	2014 Roskilde	5x5x5
Silver medal – second place	2018 Madrid	3x3x3
Silver medal – second place	2018 Madrid	5x5x5
Bronze medal – third place	2014 Roskilde	3x3x3
Bronze medal – third place	2014 Roskilde	Megaminx
German National Championship
Event	1st	2nd	3rd
3x3x3	1	3	3
4x4x4	8	0	0
5x5x5	5	1	0
Megaminx	1	1	3
Total	15	5	6
Gold medal – first place	2011 Gütersloh	4x4x4
Gold medal – first place	2012 Neuss	4x4x4
Gold medal – first place	2013 Düsseldorf	4x4x4
Gold medal – first place	2013 Düsseldorf	5x5x5
Gold medal – first place	2013 Düsseldorf	Megaminx
Gold medal – first place	2014 Düsseldorf	3x3x3
Gold medal – first place	2014 Düsseldorf	4x4x4
Gold medal – first place	2014 Düsseldorf	5x5x5
Gold medal – first place	2015 Cologne	4x4x4
Gold medal – first place	2016 Cologne	4x4x4
Gold medal – first place	2016 Cologne	5x5x5
Gold medal – first place	2017 Cologne	4x4x4
Gold medal – first place	2017 Cologne	5x5x5
Gold medal – first place	2018 Unterhaching	4x4x4
Gold medal – first place	2018 Unterhaching	5x5x5
Silver medal – second place	2014 Düsseldorf	Megaminx
Silver medal – second place	2015 Cologne	5x5x5
Silver medal – second place	2016 Cologne	3x3x3
Silver medal – second place	2017 Cologne	3x3x3
Silver medal – second place	2018 Unterhaching	3x3x3
Bronze medal – third place	2010 Bottrop	Megaminx
Bronze medal – third place	2011 Gütersloh	3x3x3
Bronze medal – third place	2012 Neuss	3x3x3
Bronze medal – third place	2012 Neuss	Megaminx
Bronze medal – third place	2015 Cologne	3x3x3
Bronze medal – third place	2015 Cologne	Megaminx

Sebastian Weyer (pronounced /ˈvaɪ.ər/, 4 December 1997) is a German Rubik's Cube speedsolver who specializes in 4x4x4 solving. Weyer has broken the 4x4x4 single solve world record 9 times and the average of five solves record 9 times. He set his first world record on 1 May 2011.

Weyer is 2-time World Champion in 4x4x4, 3-time European Champion in 4x4x4, 2014 German Champion in 3x3x3, 8-time German Champion in 4x4x4, 5-time German Champion in 5x5x5, and 2013 German Champion in Megaminx.

Weyer held the world record for the single 4x4x4 solve from 15 September 2019 to 26 November 2021, with a time of 17.42 seconds set in the Danish Open 2019. This was the first-ever sub-18-second single in competition. He last held the world record for the average of five solves on 12 May 2018.

Weyer holds the German national record for average of five 4x4x4 solves, being 19.67 seconds. With this average, he also ranks second in Europe and third in the world.

Weyer attended the World Championships in 2013, 2017, 2019, and 2025. At the 2013 World Championship in Las Vegas, Weyer placed 2nd in 4x4x4 and 3rd in 3x3x3. At the 2017 World Championship in Paris, Weyer won the 4x4x4 event. At the 2019 World Championship in Melbourne, Weyer placed 2nd in 4x4x4 and 3rd in 3x3x3, just as he did at his first World Championship in 2013. At the 2025 World Championship in Seattle, Weyer won the 4x4x4 event again, 8 years after his first win.

Weyer is the brother of speedcuber Philipp Weyer, who is the 2019 3x3x3 World Champion.

== Notable rankings ==
Rankings as of 13 November 2026.

Event	Type	Time (min:sec)	World ranking	European ranking
3x3x3	Single	4.32	94	19
3x3x3	Average	5.87	102	22
4x4x4	Single	16.41	3	2
4x4x4	Average	19.63	4	3
5x5x5	Single	36.76	21	6
5x5x5	Average	41.14	20	5
