= Anthony Michael Brooks =

American speedcuber (born 1993)

- Born: October 26, 1993 (age 33)
- Education: University of Texas at Arlington
- Known for: Speedcubing

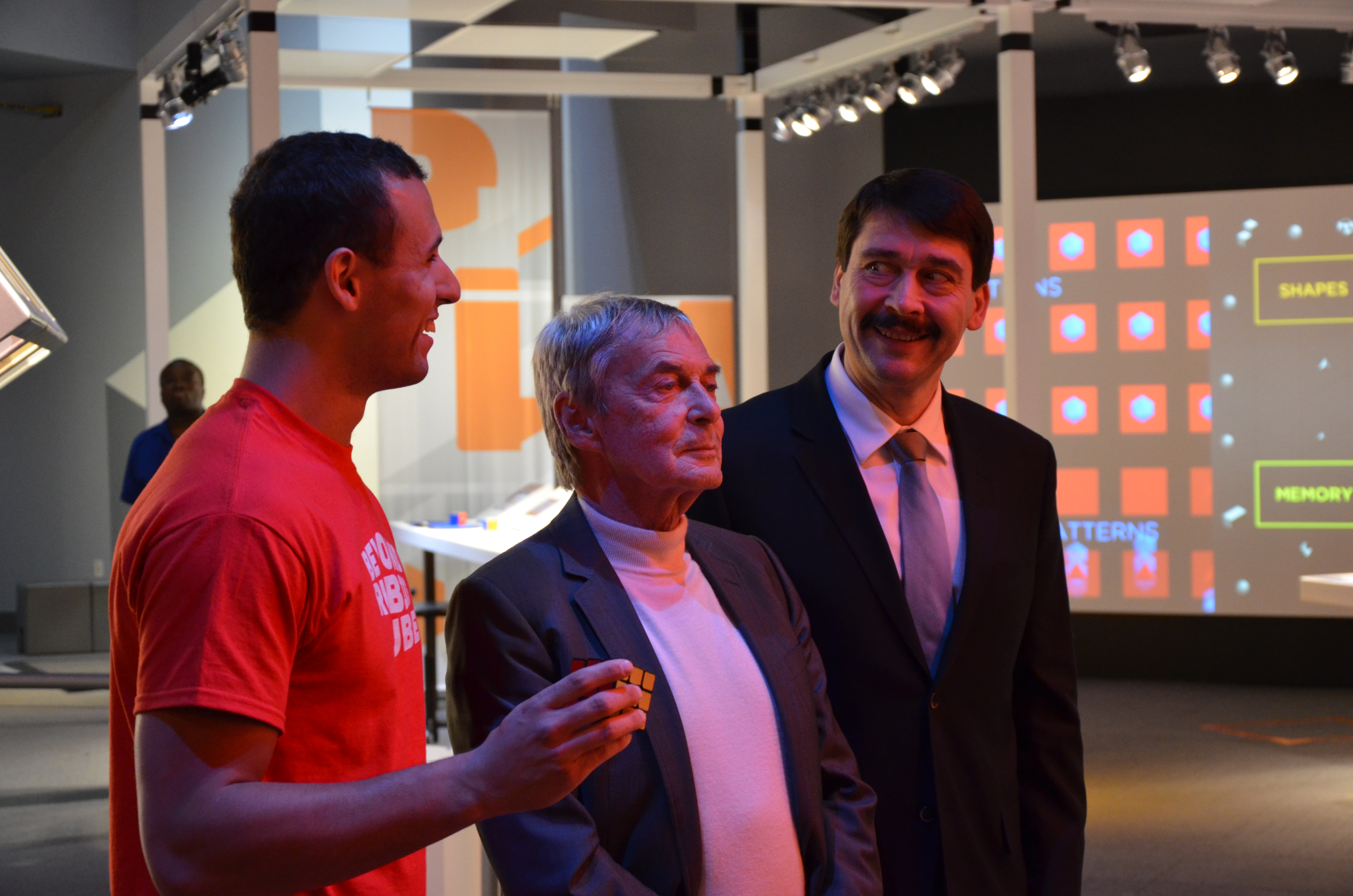
Brooks (left) pictured with Rubik's Cube inventor Erno Rubik (center) and Hungarian President Janos Ader (right) at the Liberty Science Center

Anthony Michael Brooks is an American speedcubing champion. He specializes in the 2×2×2 and 3×3×3 Rubik's cube, and was formerly officially ranked in the top five in the world in both categories by World Cube Association (WCA) rankings. Since learning to solve the cube in March 2008, he has become known for developing advanced speedsolving methods as well as frequently promoting speedcubing in the media. While working as the Liberty Science Center's Speedcuber-in-Residence, Brooks set the Guinness World Record for most Rubik's Cubes solved underwater in a single breath, and also led the team that currently holds the world record for solving the Groovik's Cube, the world's largest functioning Rubik's Cube. In July 2017, Brooks was featured on the debut season of FOX's Superhuman TV show.

== Media appearances ==
Brooks has served as a performer at the World Science Festival and has twice performed on stage at the Liberty Science Center's annual Genius Award Gala for recipients and guests such as Bill Nye, David Blaine, Sir Richard Branson, Garry Kasparov, Susan Sarandon, and will.i.am. He also acted as the principal performer at the Beyond Rubik's Cube exhibition's world premiere.

Brooks has demonstrated speedcubing live on ABC, Bloomberg Television, CNN and NPR, and has been featured in segments aired on BBC, ESPN and NBC. He made his commercial debut in Volkswagen's "You Can't Fake Fast" ad campaign and his newspaper appearances include The New York Times, The Wall Street Journal, and New York Daily News. In July 2017, he was featured on FOX's Superhuman TV show, in which he successfully solved 10 Rubik's Cubes in under two minutes.

== Personal life ==
A graduate of The Science Academy of South Texas, Brooks currently studies Economics and Business Administration at the University of Texas at Arlington. He has taught numerous people how to solve the Rubik's Cube, including his mother and younger brothers. His mother became the first person to compete under the Jamaican flag, and his brother, Brian, has seen success competing in Texas competitions. In January 2017, Brooks became the first speedcuber to win the main event of 50 World Cube Association competitions, which he described as completing a "personal goal."

== Notable results ==
=== World records ===
Event	Result	Location	Date
Rubik's Cubes underwater (single breath)	5	Liberty Science Center	August 1, 2014
Groovik's Cube (largest functioning Rubik's Cube solve)	4:29	Liberty Science Center	October 19, 2013

=== Former North American records ===
Event	Result	Competition	Date
3×3×3	6.93	Dayton Fall	October 15, 2011
Pyraminx	3.68	Austin Fall	November 14, 2009
3x3 multi-blindfolded	5/5	Denver Open	April 25, 2009

=== World Championship podiums ===
Event	Place	Result	Competition	Date
2×2×2	2	2.41	World Championship	July 17–19, 2015

=== U.S. National Championship Podiums ===
Event	Place	Result	Competition	Date
2×2×2	1	2.96	U.S. National Championship	August 12–14, 2011
3×3×3	3	8.81	U.S. National Championship	July 31 - Aug 2, 2015
