= Face Turning Octahedron =

Mechanical puzzles

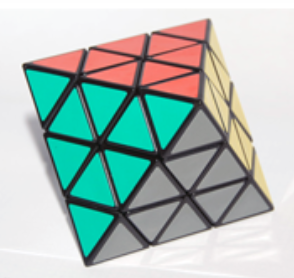
The Face Turning Octahedron in its solved state shown from the top

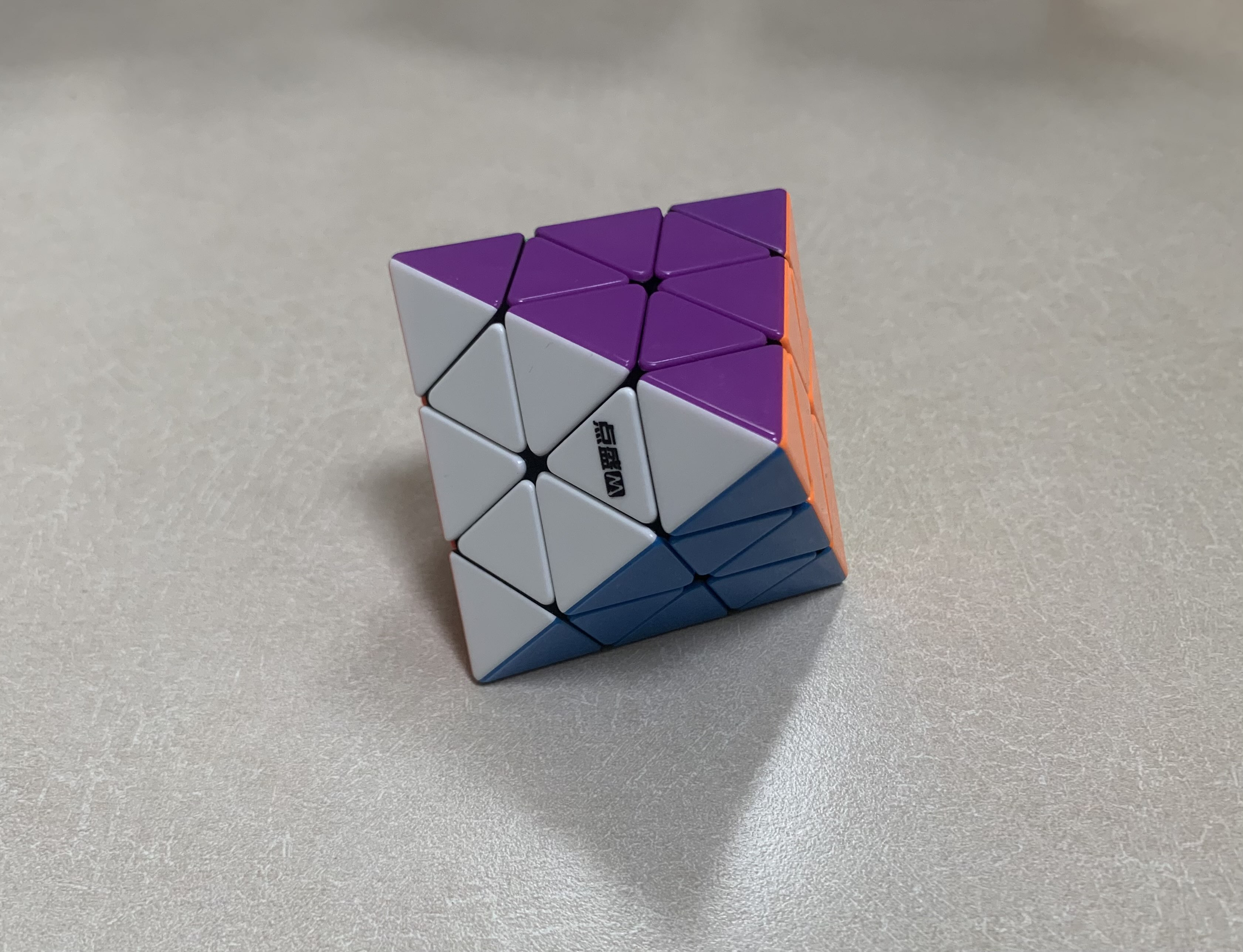
A DianSheng Face Turning Octahedron, an example of newer hardware

The Face Turning Octahedron (or Face-Turning Octahedron, often abbreviated as FTO) is a combination and mechanical puzzle. Unlike cubic puzzles, the FTO is based on an octahedral geometry with eight triangular faces that rotate independently.

== History ==
The idea of the FTO began in the early 1980s, shortly after the success of the Rubik's Cube. The earliest recorded idea came from Ernő Rubik, the creator of the Rubik's Cube. He expressed interest in the development of an FTO. Rubik envisioned a version of the puzzle that incorporated only corners and centers, and Rubik filed a patent in Hungary on October 3, 1980 with an international patent being filed on February 9, 1981.

The concept for the FTO was further established through a series of patent filings by different people. On February 9, 1982, Clarence W. Hewlett Jr. filed the first patent for an FTO in the United States, and just two weeks later, on February 24, 1982, Karl Rohrbach filed a similar patent in Germany. However, neither patent led to a commercial product which left the concept theoretical for years.

On September 15, 1997, Xie Zongliang (謝宗良) from Taiwan applied for a patent for the FTO. According to a report, approximately 1,000 units were produced by Xie in 2008, and there is some indication that the puzzle may have been constructed as early as a decade before that production run.

On July 9, 2003, David Pitcher filed a patent for an FTO. However, the patent was never formalized due to non-payment of issuance fees, allowing the invention to enter the public domain. Between 2001 and 2003, Pitcher developed a working mechanism for the puzzle and later claimed that his design was the first functional prototype of an FTO. However, Pitcher's prototype did not enter mass production, leaving uncertainty on whether Pitcher or Xie created the first working prototype.

On April 1, 2018, puzzle designer Ben Streeter began development on Bencisco, an FTO solution method with speedsolving in mind. On April 23, 2018, Streeter used his new method to achieve the world's first documented FTO solve in under a minute (previously, the best solve was by Michael Gottlieb in 1 minute, 4.86 seconds).

During the COVID-19 pandemic, interest in FTO solving grew rapidly, in large part due to Streeter's publication of a Bencisco YouTube tutorial, the creation of a speedsolving leaderboard, and the FTO Fan Club Discord server. In 2021, Streeter designed 3D-printable extensions for a mass-produced Rex Cube ("Super Ivy Cube") to cosmetically transform it into an FTO, dubbed the "RexTO". The RexTO was widely adopted, being considered a substantial hardware improvement over mass-produced FTOs. In 2024, new mass-produced FTOs were released with modern hardware improvements, such as magnets and corner-cutting, rendering the RexTO obsolete.

On June 24, 2026, the World Cube Association (Note: Shortened in this article to WCA.) announced the addition of the FTO to their officially recognized lineup of events. It will be available in competition starting on January 2, 2027.

== Mechanism ==
The FTO consists of three distinct piece types, totaling 42 external elements:

- Corner pieces: There are 6 corners, each occupying a vertex of the octahedron
- Edge pieces: There are 12 edges that are located on the intersections of the turning planes
- Triangle pieces: In addition to the corners and edges, there are 24 triangle pieces that fill the remaining gaps

The number of internal components varies depending on the manufacturer.

== Number of unique positions ==
Consider these constraints for calculating the total number of unique positions:

Permutations and orientations:

- 6 vertices (corners) can be arranged in 6! ways, with 2 orientations each
- 12 edges can be arranged in 12! ways
- Two sets of 12 centers (triangle pieces) can be arranged in (12!)^{2} ways

Restrictions:

- Only an even number of vertex pieces can be flipped (division by 2)
- Vertex and edge permutations must be even (division by 4)
- Centers are grouped in identical triplets (division by 3!^{8})
- The puzzle's orientation is fixed by one unique piece, offering 12 possible (division by 12)

Combining these factors, the total number of unique positions is:

$\frac{6! \times 2^3 \times 11! \times (12!)^2}{(3!)^8} = 31,408,133,379,194,880,000,000$

== Records ==
=== Top 5 solvers by single solve ===
| Rank | Name | Result | Competition |
|---|---|---|---|
| 1 | (United States) Aedan Bryant | 11.70s | (United States) Rubik's WCA North American Championship 2026 |
| 2 | (United States) Dan Pastushkov | 12.31s | (United States) Rubik's WCA World Championship 2025 |
| 3 | (Israel) Jonathan Rutenberg | 12.33s | (United States) Davis Big Summer 2026 |
| 4 | (United States) Chandler Pike | 13.56s | (United States) UnOrono-thodox Blocks 2025 |
| 5 | (United States) Chris Choi | 13.77s | (United States) Pittsburgh Winter 2025 |

=== Top 5 solvers by Olympic average of 5 solves ===
| Rank | Name | Result | Competition | Times |
|---|---|---|---|---|
| 1 | (United States) Aeden Bryant | 13.34s | (United States) Star City ME Summer 2026 | 12.68, 12.97, 14.38, (16.41), (12.42) |
| 2 | (Ukraine) Andrii Yavorskyi (Андрій Яворський) | 14.98s | (Ukraine) Ukrainian Nationals 2026 | 15.49, 15.21, (13.99), (15.71), 14.25 |
| 3 | (United States) Chandler Pike | 15.15s | (United States) UnOrono-thodox Blocks 2025 | (13.56), 14.34, 16.03, 15.09, (16.99) |
| 4 | (United States) Stanley Tran | 15.40s | (United States) Bay Area Speedcubin' 69 2026 | (17.37), 15.65, 15.24, (15.22), 15.31 |
| 5 | (United States) Dan Pastushkov | 15.56s | (United States) Rubik's WCA North American Championship 2026 | 15.99, (12.31), 20.17, (24.77), 14.56 |

== See also ==
- Skewb Diamond, an octahedron puzzle that would result if the middle layers from the FTO were removed. Also called a "2x2 FTO".
- Rubik's Cube
- Octahedron
