= 4x4x4 =

4x4x4 may refer to:

- Rubik's Revenge, a Rubik's Cube with the dimensions 4x4x4
- Four-wheel steering, a type of steering using all wheels in a four-wheel vehicle
