= Ron van Bruchem =

Dutch speedcuber (born 1967)

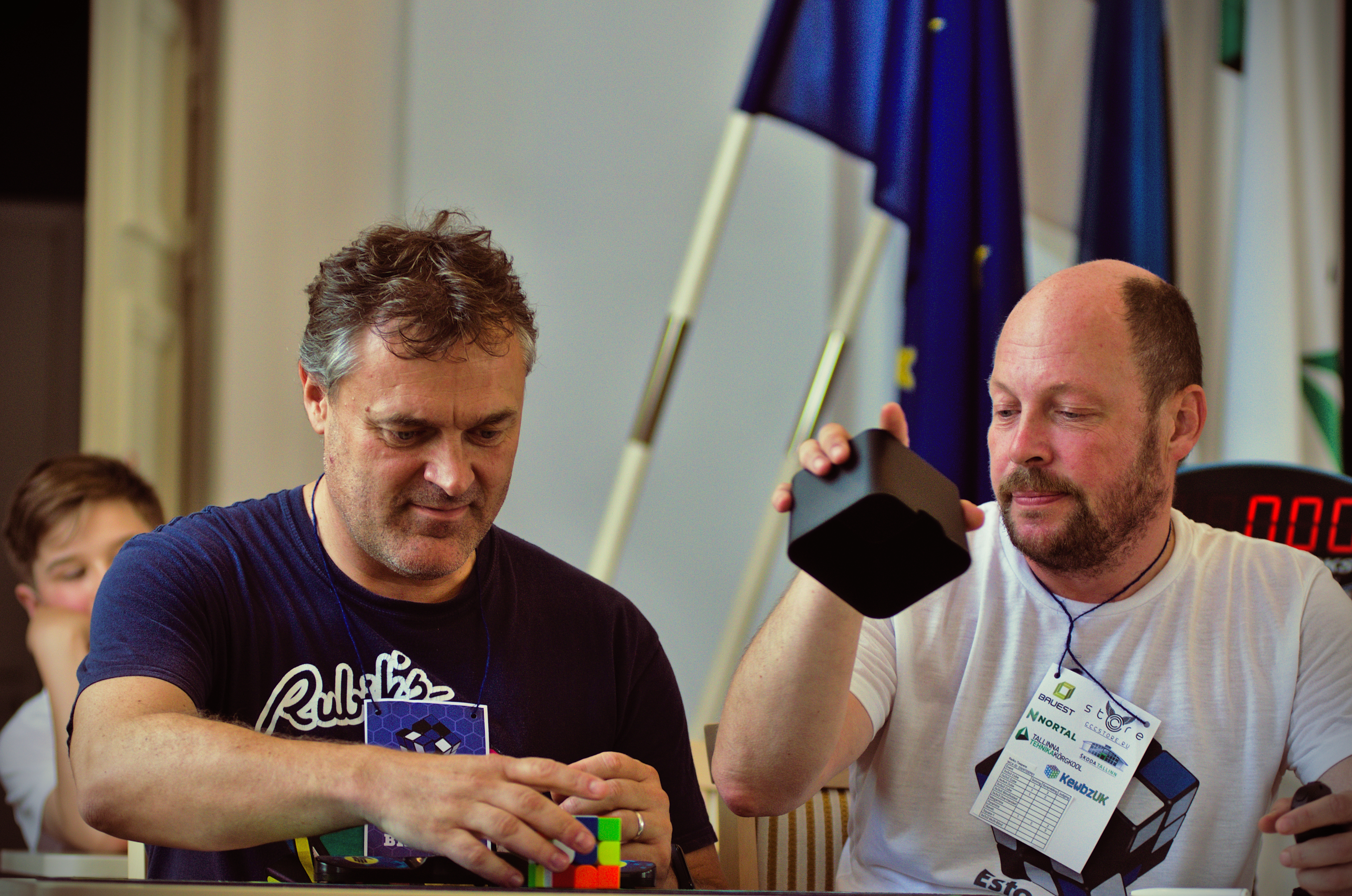
Ron van Bruchem at Estonian Open 2018

Ron van Bruchem (born 20 April 1967) is a Dutch speedcuber living in Hilversum. He helped create the current resurge of Rubik's Cube enthusiasm by helping found the World Cube Association, an organization aiming at the spread of speedcubing as a regulated sport, and organizing international Rubik's Cube competitions. He is also the founder and host of the website speedcubing.com.

== Career ==
In 1999, the first modern age speedcubers found each other on the internet via Rubik's Games, a computer game with an electronic version of Rubik's Cube. Chris Hardwick from Raleigh, NC founded multiple Yahoo Groups, including "Speedsolvingrubikscube" and the "Unofficial World Records", the latter being a place where cubers could post their personal records. Subsequently, Ron van Bruchem started speedcubing.com together with his friend Ton Dennenbroek, an avid puzzle collector. Cubers globally wanted to organize a competition where they could all meet. After failing in 2001, they finally succeeded to organize World Championship 2003 in Toronto. This first modern age Rubik's Cube competition was a success, but there were many issues because of insufficient regulation. After WC 2003, Ron van Bruchem and Tyson Mao started organizing competitions in The Netherlands/Germany and at Caltech in the USA. In 2004, they started the World Cube Association which nowadays sanctions and regulates Rubik's cube competitions in over 90 countries.

Bruchem, along with Zbigniew Zborowski, is the namesake of the ZB method. ZB is a variant of CFOP where the cross and first 3 F2L pairs are solved, then using an algorithm to solve the last pair, and the orient the edges of the last layer, called ZBLS. Then using one algorithm to solve the rest of the last layer in one step, called ZBLL.

== World records ==
Ron van Bruchem has held official world records for solving the Rubik's Cube (9.55 seconds) set at the Dutch Nationals 2007 (lost 2008), the 5x5x5 cube in 2006 (1:47.22 min) set at Belgian Open 2006, and 2x2x2 cube (2.65 seconds) set at UK Open 2007.

== Personal life ==
Ron van Bruchem was born in Hilversum, The Netherlands. He was partially raised in a facility for children of the Salvation Army. After his studies, he began working as an IT strategist at a large bank, which he still works at to this day.

Ron has a daughter named Julia, who was born December 1997.
