= Macky Makisumi =

Japanese speedcuber (born 1990)

Shotaro Makisumi (Japanese: Makisumi Shōtarō; commonly known as "Macky", born March 21, 1990, in Ube, Yamaguchi, Japan) is best known for setting several world records for speedcubing, or quickly solving the Rubik's Cube.

Macky lived in Arcadia, California, and graduated in the class of 2008 from Polytechnic School in Pasadena, California. In 2012, he graduated from Princeton University, where he majored in mathematics. He completed his Ph.D. at Stanford University in 2017 and is now a Ritt Assistant Professor of mathematics at Columbia University. He has held seven world records with the World Cube Association.

In addition to speedcubing, he is involved in mathematics competitions and juggling.

== Records held ==
=== World Records ===
- 2x2x2 Speedsolve: 4.13 seconds single; 6.29 seconds average of 5
- 3x3x3 Speedsolve: 12.11 seconds single; 14.52 seconds average of 5
- 3x3x3 Blindfolded: 2 minutes 18.52 seconds
- 3x3x3 One-handed: 23.76 seconds single; 27.56 seconds average of 3

=== Asian Records ===
- 4x4x4 Speedsolve: 1:14.55 seconds single; 1:16.39 seconds average of 3
