= Jacob's ladder (toy) =

Toy consisting of blocks held together with strings

Jacob's Ladder toy demonstration

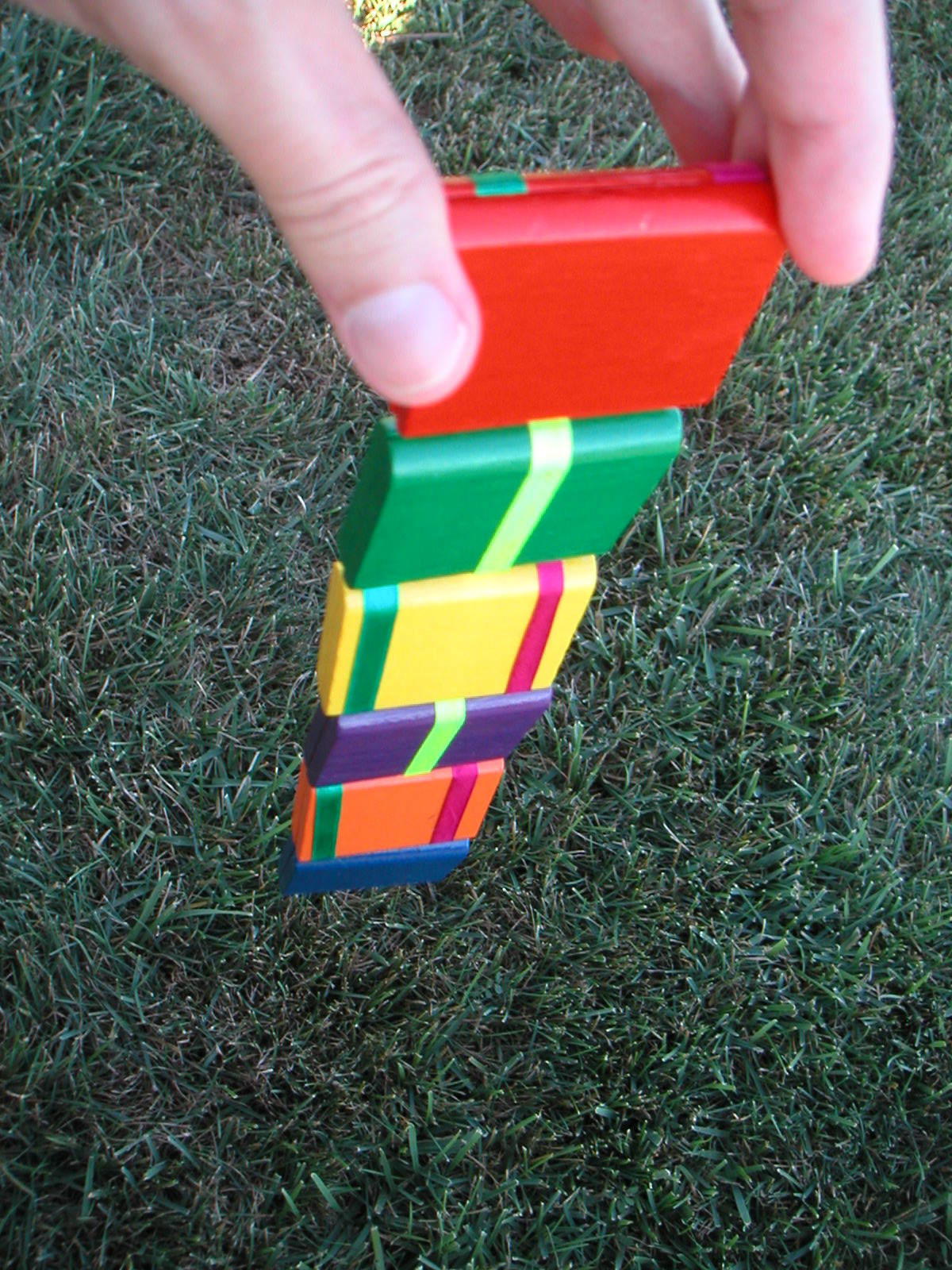
A Jacob's Ladder unfolded Watch toy in action (Ogg Theora format, 1.7 MB) (clip info)

A Jacob's ladder (also magic tablets, Chinese blocks, and klick-klack toy) is a folk toy consisting of blocks of wood held together by strings or ribbons. When the ladder is held at one end, blocks appear to cascade down the strings. This effect is a visual illusion which is the result of one block after another flipping over. It may be considered a kinetic illusion, where the blocks appear to change position when they do not. Its name Jacob's Ladder comes from the biblical ladder to heaven, mentioned in Genesis 28:12.

Of unknown origin, the earliest known review of the Jacob's Ladder is an 1889 Scientific American article which tells how it is built and works:

The simple toy ... is very illusive in action. When the upper block is grasped by the edges ... and turned so as to lift the second block in the series to the same height, the upper end of the second block falls into an inverted position, and appears to pass downward on the other members of the series, first upon one side of the ladder and then upon the other until it reaches the bottom. But this effect is only apparent, as the second block in reality only falls back into its original position in the series; but in the operation it becomes reversed, what was before the lower end becoming the upper end, the front having exchanged places with the back. This change of position of the second member brings it parallel with the third block, which is then released, and the third member drops over onto the fourth, when the fifth block is released, and so on throughout the entire series.

— "Jacob's Ladder", Scientific American, Vol. 61, No. 15 (October 1889)

== Construction ==
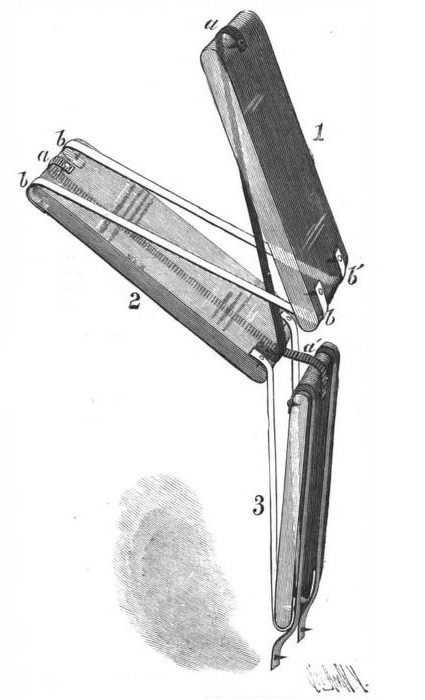
The mechanism of a Jacob's Ladder, "Fig. 2"

An arrangement of interlaced ribbons allows each block to act as if hinged to the next one at either of its two ends. The same mechanism is used in the 1980s toy Rubik's Magic, but with plastic filaments run diagonally across squares, with the result that the squares can hinge along either of two adjacent sides.

In Fig. 2 are shown the three upper blocks of the series, 1, 2, and 3, and their connecting tapes, the blocks being represented as transparent and separated from each other a short distance to show the arrangement of the connections. Block 1 has attached to it three tapes, a, b, b. The tape, a, is attached to the face of the block at the center, at the upper end, and extends over the rounded end of this block and under the rounded end of block 2. The tapes, b, b, are attached to the face of block 1, extending downwardly under the lower end of this block and upwardly over the upper end of block 2. The tape, a, which is attached to the center of the upper face of block 2, extends over the end of this block, downward underneath, the block, and over the upper end of block 3, where it is secured. This arrangement of tapes is observed throughout the entire series.

— Scientific American

== Origin ==
The toy has been variously described as originating in China, being found in Tutankhamun's tomb, and being one of the few toys allowed on Sunday by Puritans in colonial America; however, the true origins of the toy are unknown.

Many slight variants have been patented in the United States, one from the 1940s having in one block an indentation to hold a penny, which then appeared to disappear and reappear at intervals. The Japanese polymath Hiraga Gennai (1728–1780) constructed a Jacob's ladder which later came to be called "Gennai's Wondrous Click-clack" (源内の不思議なカタカタ, Gennai no fushigina katakata).

== See also ==
- Chinese block
- Jacob's ladder (string figure)
- Rhombille tiling
- Rubik's Cube
