= Édouard Chambon =

French speedcuber (born 1986)

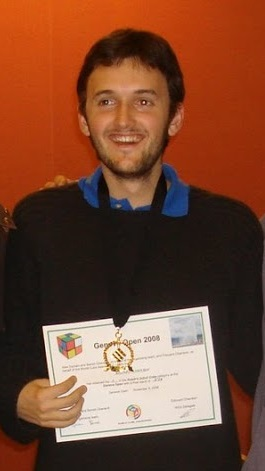
Édouard Chambon

Édouard Chambon (born 19 August 1986) is a French software engineer who was the world record holder for the fastest single time on a 3x3x3 Rubik's Cube with a time of 9.18 seconds and the fastest average time of 11.48 seconds. These records were set at the Murcia Open on 23 February 2008.

Chambon won the 3x3x3 Rubik's Cube event at the 2005 French Open, in what was only his second tournament. In the first round of this tournament, he broke the European record for the fastest average time. Later that year, he finished second in the World Championships. A series of top-four finishes followed before he broke the World record for the fastest solve at the Belgian Open in 2007. Chambon broke the world record in the first round with a 10.36 second solve. However, he was then beaten by Thibaut Jacquinot in the final. In 2008, he regained his world record with a time of 9.18 seconds. His record was broken again by Yu Nakajima, who set an average of 11.28 seconds and the best time of 8.72 on 4 May 2008 at the Kashiwa Open 2008.
