= Rubik's Magic =

Mechanical puzzle created by Erno Rubik

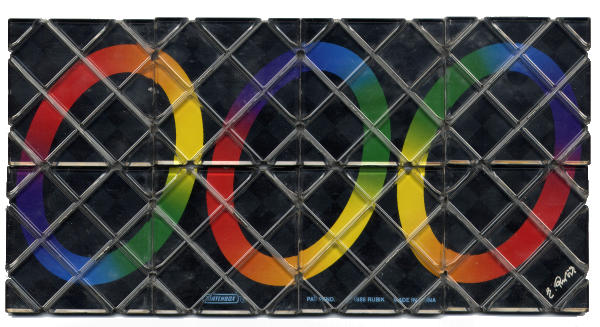
Rubik's Magic

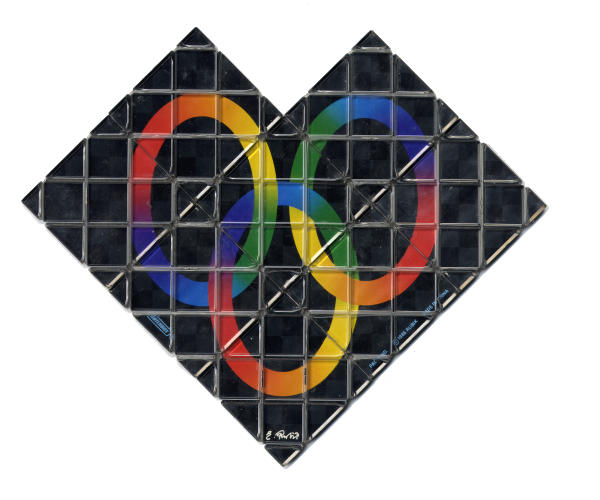
Rubik's Magic (solved)

One possible solution for Rubik's Magic

The Rubik's Magic is a mechanical puzzle invented by Ernő Rubik and first manufactured by Matchbox in the mid-1980s. The puzzle consists of eight black square tiles (changed to red squares with goldish rings in 1997) arranged in a 2 × 4 rectangle; diagonal grooves on the tiles hold wires that connect them, allowing them to be folded onto each other and unfolded again in two perpendicular directions (assuming that no other connections restrict the movement) in a manner similar to a Jacob's ladder toy. The front side of the puzzle shows, in the initial state, three separate, rainbow-colored rings; the back side consists of a scrambled picture of three interconnected rings. The goal of the game is to fold the puzzle into a heart-like shape and unscramble the picture on the back side, thus interconnecting the rings. Numerous ways to accomplish this exist, and experienced players can transform the puzzle from its initial into the solved state in less than 2 seconds. Other challenges for Rubik's Magic include reproducing given shapes (which are often three-dimensional), sometimes with certain tiles required to be in certain positions and/or orientations.

== History ==
Rubik's Magic was first manufactured by Matchbox in 1987. Professor Rubik holds both a Hungarian patent (HU 1211/85, issued 19 March 1985) and a US patent (US 4,685,680, issued 11 August 1987) on the mechanism of Rubik's Magic.

In 1987, Rubik's Magic: Master Edition was published by Matchbox; it consisted of 12 silver tiles arranged in a 2 × 6 rectangle, showing 5 interlinked rings that had to be unlinked by transforming the puzzle into a shape reminiscent of a W. Around the same time, Matchbox also produced Rubik's Magic Create the Cube, a "Level Two" version of Rubik's Magic, in which the puzzle is solved when folded into a cube with a base of two tiles, and the tile colors match at the corners of the cube. It did not have as wide a release, and is rare to find.

In 1996, the original version of Rubik's Magic was re-released by Oddzon, this time with yellow rings on a red background; other versions (for example, a variant of the original with silver tiles instead of black ones) were also produced, and there also was a strategy game based on Rubik's Magic. An unlicensed 2 × 8 version was also produced, with spheres printed on its tiles instead of rings. Custom versions as large as 2 × 12 have been built using kits available from Oddzon.

== Details ==
A Rubik's Magic chain

It can be seen that the total number of 2 × 4 rectangles that can possibly be created using Rubik's Magic is only thirty-two; these can be created from eight distinct chains. The easiest way to classify chains is by the means of the middle tile of the puzzle's finished form (the only tile that has segments of all three rings) and the tile next to it featuring a yellow/orange ring segment (the indicator tile).

Every chain either has the middle tile on the outside (O) or the inside (I) of the chain; if it is arranged so that the indicator tile is to the right of the middle tile, then the position of the ring segment on the indicator tile can either be the upper left (UL), upper right (UR), lower left (LL), or lower right (LR) corner. The position and orientation of the remaining tiles are then determined by the middle and indicator tiles, and eight distinct chains (OUL to ILR) are obtained, although the naming convention is not standardized.

Similarly, the 2 × 4 rectangle forms of them can be categorized. Each of these forms has exactly one chain associated with it, and each chain yields four different rectangle forms, depending on the position of the edge where it is folded with regard to the middle tile. By concatenating one of the numbers 0, 1, 2, or 3 to the chain's name, depending on whether the number of tiles to the right of the middle tile before the folding edge, a categorization of the rectangle forms is obtained. The starting position, for example, is rectangle form OUR2. The cube now is rainbow and has silver rings. A game rule for this one is you can match the silver rings and color squares, which can make it more complicated. A similar classification can also be obtained for the heart-shaped forms of the puzzle, of which 64 exist.

== Analysis ==
One question when analyzing Rubik's Magic concerns its state space: What is the set of configurations that can be reached from the initial state? This question is harder to answer than for Rubik's Cube, because the set of operations on Rubik's Magic does not form a mathematical group.

The basic operation (move) consists of transferring a hinge between two tiles T_{1} and T_{2}, from one pair of edges (E_{11} of T_{1} and E_{21} on T_{2}) to another pair E_{12} and E_{22}. Here, edges E_{11} and E_{12} are adjacent on tile T_{1}, and so are edges E_{21} and E_{22} on tile T_{2} but in opposite order. See the figure below for an example, where E_{11} is the East edge of the yellow tile, E_{21} is the West edge of the red tile, and both E_{21} and E_{22} are the North edges.

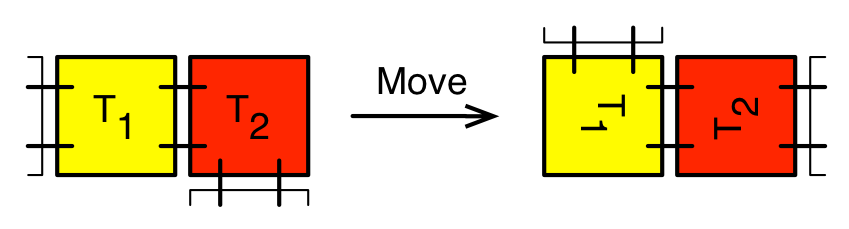
A basic move, transferring a hinge between two tiles to another pair of edges

In order to carry out such a move, the hinge being moved cannot cross another hinge. Thus, the two hinges on a tile can take up one of five relative positions (see figure below). The positions are encoded as a number in the range from -2 to +2, called the wrap. The difference between wrap -2 and wrap +2 is the order of the neighboring tiles (which one is on top). The total wrap of a configuration is calculated as the alternating sum of the wraps of the individual tiles in the chain.

The total wrap is invariant under a move. Thus, one can calculate the number of theoretically possible shapes of the chain (disregarding the patterns on the individual tiles) as 1351.

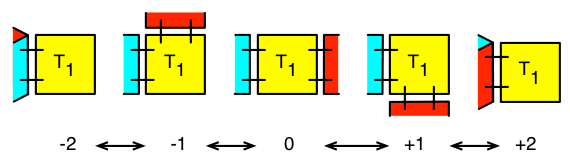
All possible relative positions of the two hinges on a single tile; the number below the tile is the amount of wrap

Furthermore, the other tiles in the chain will have to move through space appropriately to allow the folding and unfolding needed to carry out a move. This limits the practically reachable number of configurations further. That number also depends on how much stretching of the wires you tolerate.

== Records ==
The world record for a single solve of the Magic is 0.69 seconds, set by Yuxuan Wang. Yuxuan Wang also holds the record for an average of five solves - 0.76 seconds set at the Beijing Summer Open 2011 competition. Due to the World Cube Association no longer recognizing Rubik's Magic as an official event in 2012, Yuxuan Wang holds the permanent official world record for this puzzle.

=== Top 5 Magic singles ===
Position	Name	Single	Nationality	Competition
1	Yuxuan Wang (王宇轩)	0.69	China	(China) Beijing Spring 2011
2	Congbing Jiang (蒋丛骉)	0.77	China	(China) Suzhou Open 2011
2	Dmitry Kryuzban	0.77	Russia	(Russia) MPEI Open 2011
2	Oskar Åsbrink	0.77	Sweden	(Sweden) Swedish Open 2011
2	Tang Yiu Chun (鄧耀俊)	0.77	Hong Kong, China	(China) Shenzhen Summer Open 2009

=== Top 5 solvers by average of 5 solves ===
Position	Name	Average	Nationality	Competition	Times
1	Yuxuan Wang (王宇轩)	0.76	China	(China) Beijing Summer Open 2011	0.72 / 0.77 / 0.77 / 0.75 / DNF
2	Jan Dickmann	0.82	Germany	(Germany) Aachen Open 2011	0.83 / 0.83 / 0.84 / 0.80 / 0.80
3	Dmitry Kryuzban	0.84	Russia	(Poland) Euro 2012	0.81 / 0.84 / 1.46 / 0.86 / 0.81
3	Ming Gao (高鸣)	0.84	China	(China) BUAA Open 2010	0.80 / 0.86 / 0.81 / 0.86 / DNF
5	Jakub Kipa	0.85	Poland	(Poland) Warszawa Open 2012	0.86 / 0.86 / 0.84 / 0.88 / 0.80

== Rubik's Magic: Master Edition ==
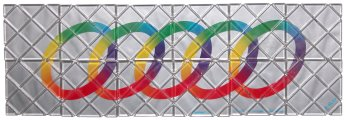
Rubik's Magic: Master Edition

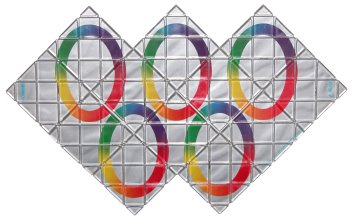
Rubik's Magic: Master Edition in solved state

Video on YouTube see video to see how solving one looks like.

Rubik's Magic: Master Edition (most commonly known as Master Magic) was manufactured by Matchbox in 1987. It is a modification from the Rubik's Magic, with 12 tiles instead of the original's 8. The puzzle has 12 panels interconnected with nylon wires in a 2 × 6 rectangular shape, measuring approximately 4.25 inches (10.5 cm) by 13 inches (32 cm). The goal of the game is the same as for Rubik's Magic, which is to fold the puzzle from a 2 × 6 rectangular shape into a W-like shape with a certain tile arrangement. Initially, the front side shows a set of 5 linked rings. Once solved, the puzzle takes the shape of the letter W, and shows 5 unlinked rings on the back side of the previous initial state.

As a puzzle, the Master Edition is actually simpler than the original Rubik's Magic. With more hinges, the player can work on one part, mostly ignoring the other parts. The minimal solution involves 16 quarter-turn moves. There are multiple solutions. The puzzle was an official World Cube Association (WCA) event from 2003 to 2012.

=== Top 5 singles ===
Position	Name	Single	Nationality	Competition
1	Yuxuan Wang (王宇轩)	1.66	China	(China) Tianjin Winter 2012
2	Ernie Pulchny	1.68	United States	(United States) Park Ridge Open 2011
3	Mátyás Kuti	1.72	Hungary	(Belgium) Belgian Open 2008
4	Denis Uglov	1.75	Russia	(Russia) MNW Open 2012
4	Kamil Fiedoruk	1.75	Poland	(Poland) Euro 2012

=== Top 5 solvers by average of 5 solves ===
Position	Name	Average	Nationality	Competition	Times
1	Ernie Pulchny	1.75	United States	(United States) US Nationals 2011	1.78 / 1.71 / 1.77 / 1.71 / 3.08
2	Haokun Wang (王皓琨)	1.93	China	(China) Tianjin Open 2012	1.97 / 1.91 / 2.61 / 1.83 / 1.90
3	Máté Horváth	1.95	Hungary	(Spain) Euro 2008	1.97 / 1.90 / 1.98 / 1.88 / DNF
3	Ramón Dersch	1.95	Germany	(Germany) Hessen Open 2012	1.88 / 2.08 / 1.84 / 5.59 / 1.90
3	Yuxuan Wang (王宇轩)	1.95	China	(China) Wuhan Open 2012	1.90 / 2.18 / 1.78 / 1.71 / 2.75

== Reviews ==
- Jeux & Stratégie #42
- 1986 Games 100

== See also ==
- Pocket Cube
- Rubik's Cube
- Rubik's Revenge
- Professor's Cube
- V-Cube 6
- V-Cube 7
- V-Cube 8
- Combination puzzles
- Mechanical puzzles
- Jacob's ladder (toy)
