= Chris Hardwick (speedcuber) =

American speedcuber (born 1983)

- Born: December 6, 1983 (age 42); Merritt Island, Florida, U.S.
- Years active: 2003–present
- Known for: Rubik's Cube speedsolving
Medal record
Representing United States
Speedcubing
WCA World Championship
Event	1st	2nd	3rd
4×4×4	0	0	1
3×3×3 One-Handed	1	0	1
4×4×4 Blindfolded	1	1	1
5×5×5 Blindfolded	1	1	0
Total	3	2	3
Gold medal – first place	2003 Toronto	3×3×3 One-Handed
Gold medal – first place	2007 Budapest	4×4×4 Blindfolded
Gold medal – first place	2011 Bangkok	5×5×5 Blindfolded
Silver medal – second place	2009 Düsseldorf	5×5×5 Blindfolded
Silver medal – second place	2011 Bangkok	4×4×4 Blindfolded
Bronze medal – third place	2005 Lake Buena Vista	4×4×4
Bronze medal – third place	2005 Lake Buena Vista	3×3×3 One-Handed
Bronze medal – third place	2009 Düsseldorf	4×4×4 Blindfolded

Christopher Michael Hardwick (born December 6, 1983) is an American speedcuber. He is known for his achievements in the 3×3×3 blindfolded and one-handed events. He has represented the United States at several international competitions organized by the World Cube Association (WCA).

== Early life and education ==
Hardwick was born on December 6, 1983 in Merritt Island, Florida. He attended the North Carolina School of Science and Mathematics (class of 2002) and later graduated from the University of North Carolina at Chapel Hill (class of 2005).

== Rubik's Cube career ==
Hardwick began his competitive cubing career as a 3×3×3 one-handed solver before specializing in blindfolded events. He has competed in various events and has earned medals in several categories at world championships. Notable achievements in Hardwick's Rubik's Cube career include:

- 3×3×3 One-handed: He won the one-handed event at the World Rubik's Games Championship 2003 in Toronto.
- 4×4×4: He has set 3 world records in this event, from 2004 to 2005.
- 4×4×4 Blindfolded: He has earned medals in blindfolded events at many competitions. Notably, Hardwick has set the world record three times in this event, his fastest time being 4:46.19 at Chattahoochee Spring competition 2009.
- 5×5×5 Blindfolded: He also set records in this event, and he holds a former world record for the blindfolded solve of a 5×5×5 with a time of 15 minutes and 22 seconds.

== Media appearances ==
Hardwick has appeared on numerous television programs and online platforms to demonstrate his Rubik's Cube skills. His television appearances include features on MTV in 2002 and segments on Canada AM and Much Music in the fall of 2003, where he discussed the 2003 Rubik's Cube World Championships. His home videos have also appeared on numerous online video sites including CollegeHumor and Digg. In 2006, a home video of his one-handed 3×3×3 solve was broadcast on VH1 as part of the program Web Junk 20. Additionally, one of his home videos was parodied in a 2006 South African Axe deodorant commercial for their "Get a Girlfriend" commercial campaign.

Hardwick has also been referenced in popular media. For example, comedian Chris Hardwick, who shares the same name, mentioned him on the program Web Soup in 2009, and the two later met in person at the comedian's live show in Madison, Wisconsin on April 11, 2015.
