= Ernő Rubik =

Hungarian inventor (born 1944)

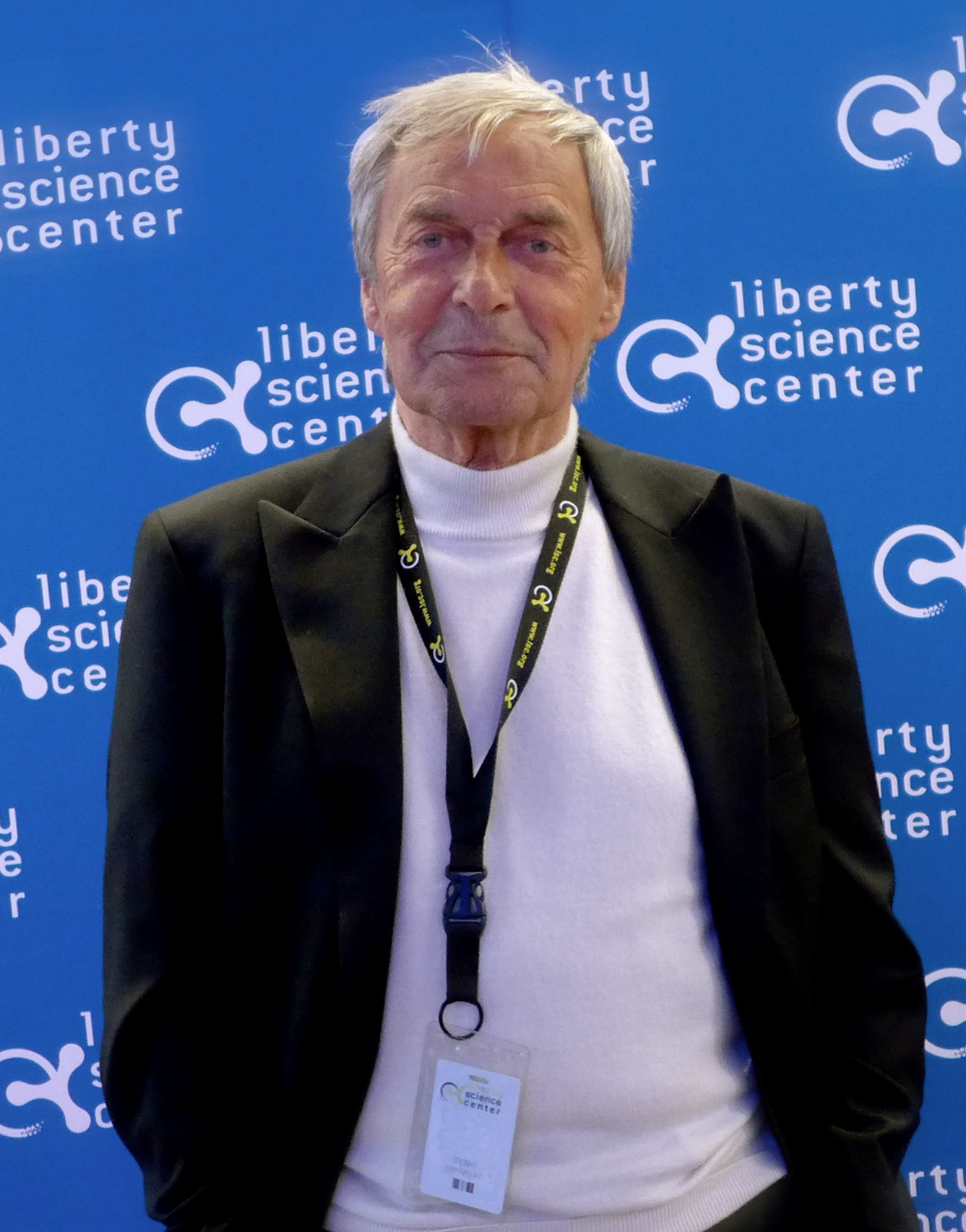
- Rubik in 2014
- Born: 13 July 1944 (age 82); Budapest, Hungary
- Education: Budapest University of Technology and Economics (architecture); Moholy-Nagy University of Art and Design; Interior Architecture and Design
- Occupations: Inventor, designer, businessman
- Years active: 1971−present
- Employer: Rubik Brand Ltd. (U.S.)
- Known for: Puzzle designer of Rubik's Cube, inventor, architect, professor
- Title: Chairman
- Board member of: Judit Polgar Foundation
- Spouse: Ágnes Hégely
- Parent(s): Ernő Rubik, Magdolna Szántó

Ernő Rubik (Hungarian: [ˈrubik ˈɛrnøː]; born 13 July 1944) is a Hungarian architect and inventor widely known for creating the Rubik's Cube (1974), Rubik's Magic, and Rubik's Snake.

While a professor of design at the Budapest College of Applied Arts, he pursued his hobby of building geometric models. One of these was a prototype of his cube, made of 27 wooden blocks; it took Rubik a month to solve the cube after scrambling it. It proved a useful tool for teaching group theory, and in late 1977, Konsumex, Hungary's state trading company, began marketing it. By 1980, Rubik's Cube was marketed throughout the world, and over 100 million authorized units were sold, mostly during its subsequent three years of popularity. Approximately 50 books were published describing how to solve the puzzle of Rubik's Cube. Following his cube's popularity, Rubik opened a studio to develop designs in 1984; among its products was another popular puzzle toy, Rubik's Magic.

Recently, Rubik has been involved with several organizations that promote science and math learning to children, such as the Rubik Learning Initiative and the Judit Polgar Foundation.

== Early life and education ==
Ernő Rubik was born in Budapest, Hungary, on 13 July 1944, during World War II. His father, who was also named Ernő Rubik, was a flight engineer at the Esztergom aircraft factory, and his mother, Magdolna Szántó, was a poet.

His father, Ernő, was a highly respected engineer of gliders. His extensive work and expertise in this area gained him an international reputation as an expert in his field. Ernő Rubik has stated that:

Beside him I learned a lot about work in the sense of a value-creating process which has a target, and a positive result too. Both figuratively and literally he was a person capable of 'moving a hill'. There was nothing that could prevent him from doing what he decided or bringing a project to a completion, if necessary even with his own hands. No work was unworthy or undeserving for him.

From 1958 to 1962, Rubik specialized in sculpture at the Secondary School of Fine and Applied Arts. From 1962 to 1967, Rubik attended the Budapest University of Technology where he became a member of the Architecture Faculty. From 1967 to 1971, Rubik attended the Hungarian Academy of Applied Arts and Design and was in the Faculty of Interior Architecture and Design.

Rubik considers university and the education it afforded him as the decisive event which shaped his life. Rubik stated, "Schools offered me the opportunity to acquire knowledge of subjects or rather crafts that need a lot of practice, persistence, and diligence with the direction of a mentor."

== Career ==
=== Professorship and origin of the Rubik's Cube ===
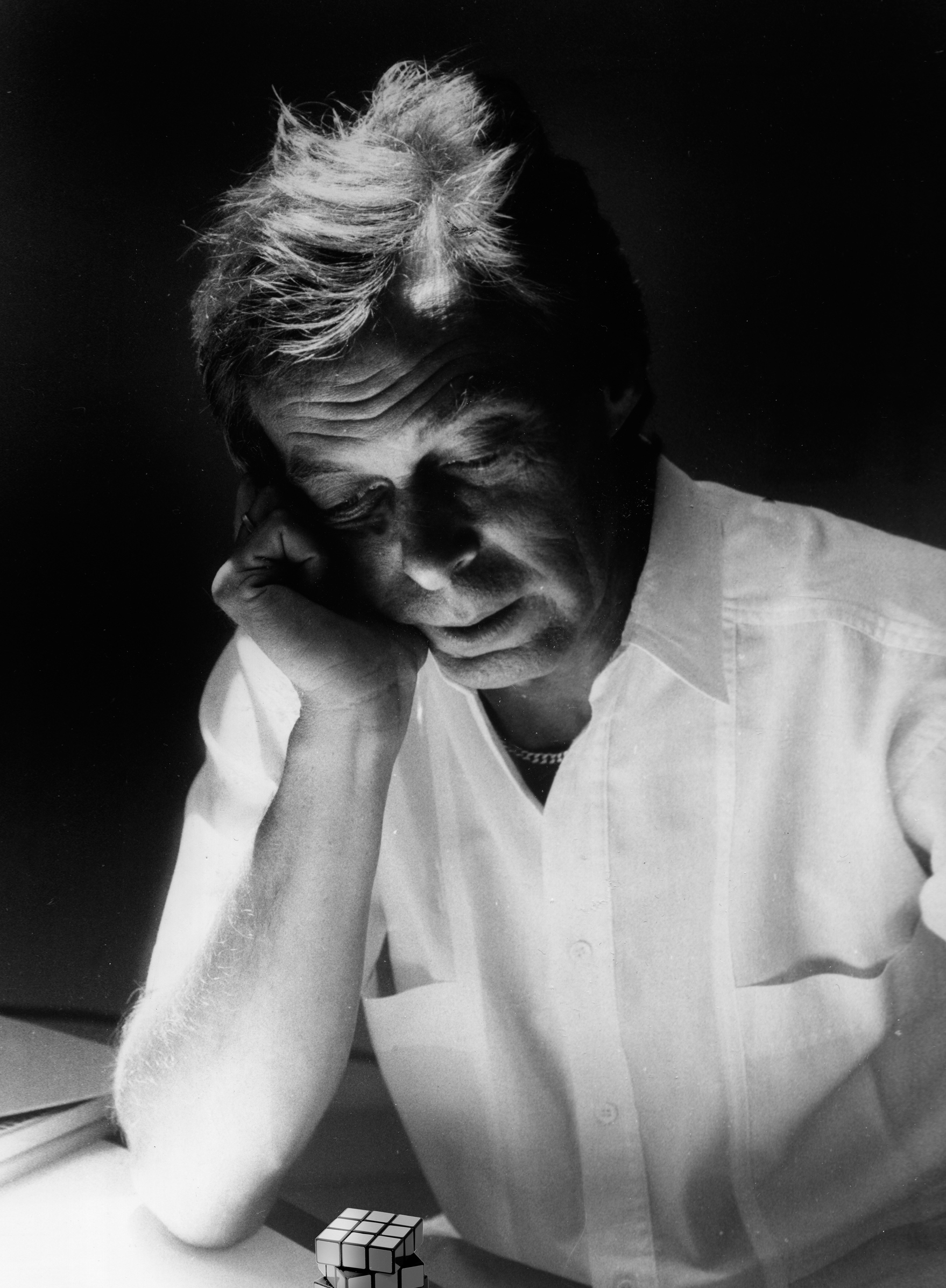
A black-and-white photograph of Rubik.

From 1971 to 1979, Rubik was a professor of architecture at the Budapest College of Applied Arts (Iparművészeti Főiskola). It was during his time there that he built designs for a three-dimensional puzzle and completed the first working prototype of the Rubik's Cube in 1974, applying for a patent on the puzzle in 1975. In an interview with CNN, Rubik stated that he was "searching to find a good task for my students."

Space always intrigued me, with its incredibly rich possibilities, space alteration by (architectural) objects, objects' transformation in space (sculpture, design), movement in space and in time, their correlation, their repercussion on mankind, the relation between man and space, the object and time. I think the CUBE arose from this interest, from this search for expression and for this always more increased acuteness of these thoughts...

Rubik's Cube

Starting with blocks of wood and rubber bands, Rubik set out to create a structure that would allow the individual pieces to move without the whole structure falling apart. Rubik originally used wood for the block because of the convenience of a workshop at the university and because he viewed wood as a simple material to work with that did not require sophisticated machinery. Rubik made the original prototypes of his cube by hand, cutting the wood, boring the holes and using elastic bands to hold the contraption together.

Rubik showed his prototype to his class and his students liked it very much. Rubik realized that because of the cube's simple structure, it could be manufactured relatively easily and might have appeal to a larger audience. Rubik's father possessed several patents, so Rubik was familiar with the process and applied for a patent for his invention. Rubik then set out to find a manufacturer in Hungary, but had great difficulty due to the rigid planned economy of communist Hungary at the time. Eventually, Rubik was able to find a small company that worked with plastic and made chess pieces. The cube was originally known in Hungary as the Magic Cube.

Rubik licensed the Magic Cube to Ideal Toys, a U.S. company, in 1979. Ideal rebranded The Magic Cube to the Rubik's Cube before it was introduced to an international audience in 1980. The process from early prototype to mass production of the Cube had taken over six years. The Rubik's Cube became an instant success worldwide, won several Toy of the Year awards, and became a staple of 1980s popular culture. By 2024, over 500 million Rubik's Cubes had been sold, making it one of the best selling toys of all time.

=== Other inventions ===
In addition to Rubik's Cube, Rubik is also the inventor of Rubik's Magic, Rubik's Snake and Rubik's 360 along with several others.

=== Later career and other works ===
In the early 1980s, he became the editor of a game and puzzle journal called ..És játék (...And games), then became self-employed in 1983, founding the Rubik Stúdió, where he designed furniture and games. In 1987, he became a professor with full tenure; in 1990, he became the president of the Hungarian Engineering Academy (Magyar Mérnöki Akadémia). At the academy, he created the International Rubik Foundation to support especially talented young engineers and industrial designers.

He also gave a lecture and autograph session at the "Bridges-Pecs" conference ("Bridges between Mathematics and the Arts") in July 2010.

In 2009, he was appointed as an honorary professor of Keimyung University in Daegu, South Korea.

In the 2010s, Rubik has recently spent much of his time working on Beyond Rubik's Cube, a Science, Technology, Engineering, Mathematics (STEM fields) based exhibition, which would travel the globe over the next six years. The grand opening of the exhibit was held on 26 April 2014 at the Liberty Science Center in New Jersey. At the exhibition, Rubik gave several lectures, tours, and engaged with the public and several members of the speedcubing crowd in attendance, including Anthony Michael Brooks, a world-class speedcuber.

Rubik is a member of the USA Science and Engineering Festival's advisory board.

== Influences ==
Ernő Rubik has listed several individuals who, as he has said, "exerted a great influence over me through their work." These include Leonardo da Vinci, whom Rubik regards as the Renaissance man; Michelangelo, whom he respects as a polymath, painter, and sculptor; and artist M. C. Escher, who drew impossible constructions and grappled with explorations of infinity. As regards to philosophers and writers, Rubik admires Voltaire, Stendhal, Thomas Mann, Jean-Paul Sartre, Hungarian poet Attila József, Jules Verne, and Isaac Asimov. In the field of architecture, Rubik is an admirer of Frank Lloyd Wright and Le Corbusier.

== Personal life ==
Rubik describes himself as a lifelong bibliophile, saying "books offered me the possibility of gaining knowledge of the world, nature and people". He has a special interest in science fiction. As well, he is fond of nature walks, sports, sailing on Lake Balaton – and gardening, saying "collecting succulents is my favourite pastime". He usually declines offers to participate in Rubik's Cube speed-solving competitions, although he did attend the 2007 World Championships in Budapest.

== Prizes and awards ==
- 1978 – Budapest International Trade Fair, Prize for the Cube
- 1980 – Toy of the Year: Federal Republic of Germany, United Kingdom, France, USA
- 1981 – Toy of the Year: Finland, Sweden, Italy
- 1982 – Toy of the Year: United Kingdom (second time)
- 1982 – The Museum of Modern Art, New York selected Rubik's Cube into its permanent collection
- 1983 – Hungarian State Prize for demonstrating and teaching 3D structures and for the various solutions that inspired scientific researches in several ways
- 1988 – Juvenile Prize from the State Office of Youth and Sport
- 1995 – Dénes Gabor Prize from the Novofer Foundation as an acknowledgement of achievements in the field of innovation
- 1996 – Ányos Jedlik Prize from the Hungarian Patent Office
- 1997 – Prize for the Reputation of Hungary (1997)
- 2007 – Kossuth Prize (the most prestigious cultural award in Hungary)
- 2008 – Moholy-Nagy Prize – from the Moholy-Nagy University of Arts and Design
- 2009 – EU Ambassador of the Year of Creativity and Innovation
- 2010 – USA Science and Engineering Festival Award (Outstanding Contribution to Science Education)
- 2014 – Hungarian Order of Saint Stephen (The highest Hungarian state honour)
- 2014 – Honorary Citizen of Budapest

== Publications ==
- Co-author of The Rubik's Cube Compendium (written by David Singmaster, Ernő Rubik, Gerzson Kéri, György Marx, Tamás Varga and Tamás Vekerdy), Oxford University Press, 1987.
- Author of Cubed – The Puzzle of Us All, Flatiron Books/Orion Publishing Group /Hachette UK/Libri, 2020.
