= Yu Nakajima =

Japanese speedcuber (born 1991)

- Born: February 15, 1991 (age 35); Ebetsu, Hokkaidō, Japan
- Known for: Speedcubing

Yu Nakajima (中島 悠; born February 15, 1991 in Ebetsu, Hokkaidō) is a Japanese Rubik's Cube solver.

Yu held the former world record for Rubik's Cube average (11.28 seconds) and single (8.72 seconds). He beat the previous world record holder Edouard Chambon, who had a single solve record of 9.18 seconds. Both records were set on May 5, 2008, at the Kashiwa Open 2008. On May 23, 2008 Yu posted a video on YouTube where he completed the cube in 6.57 seconds. He also solved the Rubik's magic in 1.05 seconds. He set the World Record for the Professor's Cube at 54.86 seconds in April 2012.
