= Tyson Mao =

American speedcuber (born 1984)

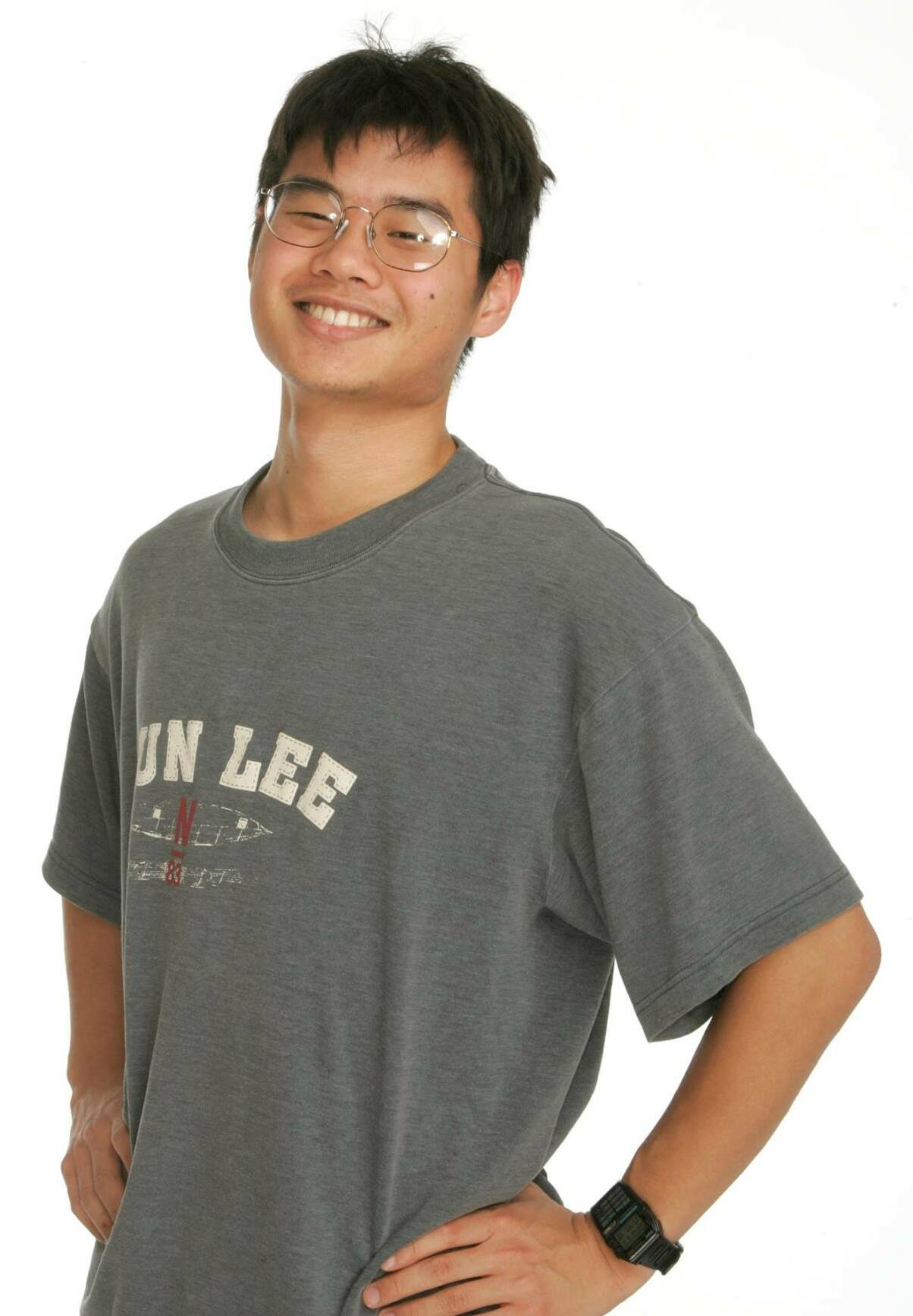
- Born: May 8, 1984 (age 42); San Francisco, California, U.S.
- Education: California Institute of Technology (BS)
- Years active: 2006–present
- Spouse: Joyce Huynh

Tyson Mao (born May 8, 1984) is an American Rubik's Cube speedsolver. He is a co-founder and a former board member of the World Cube Association, the organization responsible for overseeing competitive Rubik's Cube events. In 2005, he set the world record for the 3×3×3 blindfolded event. In 2006, he appeared as a contestant on the CW Television Network's Beauty and the Geek.

== Personal life ==
Mao was born in San Francisco, California to a Taiwanese American family; his parents were immigrants from Tainan, Taiwan. He lives in the San Francisco Bay Area and previously used to work as a Poker Product Manager for Zynga. He graduated from the California Institute of Technology in 2006 with a degree in astrophysics.

In 2017, Mao opened the Wursthall Restaurant & Bierhaus in San Mateo, California with partners Adam Simpson and J. Kenji López-Alt. In September 2025, Wursthall announced that it would be closing by the end of the month.

== Rubik's Cube career ==
Mao began solving the Rubik’s Cube during its second surge in popularity in 2003. Initially using a beginner’s method, he later advanced to techniques such as the Petrus and CFOP methods. He is credited with popularizing the “Caltech move,” a technique that solves the three diagonal corner permutations in blindfolded solving. Using this, Tyson got two world records at Northern California Fall Open 2005. In addition to his competitive achievements, he has been a key organizer of major Rubik’s Cube competitions in the United States, including the US Nationals (through 2013) and various ones at Caltech.

=== Tyson Mao's beginner method ===
Mao developed a method aimed for beginners presented as an eight-part video series, which was formerly available on Rubiks.com. This instructional method gained additional attention after it was featured in the 2006 film The Pursuit of Happyness. His approach uses a simplified layer-by-layer method, incorporating elements designed to reduce complexity he by reducing the amount of algorithm memorization needed.

== Media appearances ==
Mao has appeared on various television programs and media outlets, including:

- Beauty and the Geek Season 2
- CNN's Anderson Cooper 360° (Air date: December 15, 2006)
- Identity
- The Tonight Show with Jay Leno (Air date: January 27, 2006)
- Twins
- USA Network: Show Us Your Character
- Good Morning America (Air date: February 4, 2008)
