= World Cube Association =

Organization that regulates Rubik's Cube and other twisty puzzle competitions

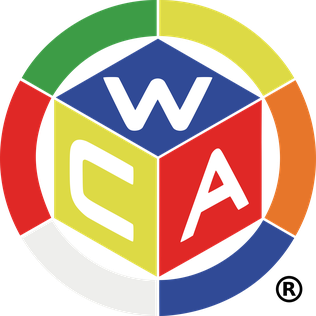
- Current WCA Logo, designed by Justin Eastman in January 2005
- Abbreviation: WCA
- Formation: 18 October 2004
- Founders: Ron van Bruchem, Tyson Mao
- Type: Sport Association
- Headquarters: Los Angeles, California, US
- Members: Free
- Official language: English
- Executive Director: Dan Smith
- Board of directors: Abdullah Gulab, Ruben Lopez De Juan, Oliver Hexter, Glib Vedmid
- Main organ: Board
- Staff: 3 Board of Directors, 11 Committee Leaders (including Board members as a whole), 464 WCA Delegates (excluding trainees), 112 Committee Members
- Website: worldcubeassociation.org

The World Cube Association (WCA) is the worldwide non-profit organization that regulates and holds competitions for mechanical puzzles that are operated by twisting groups of pieces, commonly known as twisty puzzles (a subcategory of combination puzzles). The most famous of those puzzles is the Rubik's Cube. The WCA was founded by Ron van Bruchem of the Netherlands and Tyson Mao of the United States in 2004. The goal of the World Cube Association is to have "more competitions in more countries with more people and more fun, under fair and equal conditions." In 2017, they started work to become a non-profit organization and on 20 November 2017, the state of California accepted the initial registration of the World Cube Association.

The organization is run by the board members. It assigns different teams and committees as well as delegates who can organize official competitions. The presence of a delegate is required to make the competition official. As of August 2026, over 290,000 people from around the world have participated in WCA competitions, and over 17,500 competitions have been held.

== Board ==
=== Current WCA Board Members ===
As of 2026

The WCA Board is responsible for leading the organization as a whole, and fulfilling any duties not fulfilled by other Teams, Committees, and Councils. Additionally, Dan Smith serves as the Executive Director of the WCA.

Member	Country	Board member since
Abdullah Gulab	Pakistan	July 2025
Sachin Arvind	India	May 2026
Glib Vedmid	Ukraine	May 2026
Oliver Hexter	United Kingdom	May 2026
Rubén López de Juan	Spain	May 2026

=== Former WCA Board Members ===
Member	Country	Term
Gilles Roux	France	October 2004 – November 2008
Ron van Bruchem	Netherlands	October 2004 – July 2018
Masayuki Akimoto	Japan	September 2005 – January 2012
Tyson Mao	United States	October 2004 – August 2013
Sébastien Auroux	Germany	July 2012 – February 2014
Tim Reynolds	United States	July 2012 – December 2014
Natán Riggenbach	Peru	September 2013 – August 2015
Olivér Perge	Hungary	March 2015 – February 2016, July 2017
Pedro Santos Guimarães	Brazil	March 2015 – July 2018
Ilkyoo Choi	South Korea	September 2013 – July 2017
Chris Hardwick	United States	July 2016 – November 2017
Luis J. Iáñez	Spain	July 2016 – July 2018
Alberto Pérez de Rada Fiol	Spain	November 2017 – November 2019
Chris Wright	United Kingdom	September 2018 – September 2020
Bob Burton	United States	November 2017 – November 2021
Henrik Buus Aagaard	Denmark	November 2019 – November 2021
Saransh Grover	India	September 2020 – September 2022
Callum James Goodyear	United Kingdom	September 2020 – January 2023
Somya Srivastava	India	July 2022 – January 2024
Michael Chai	United States	July 2023 – October 2024
Ethan Pride	Australia	July 2019 – July 2025
Dan Smith	United States	January 2025 – March 2026
Kerrie Jarman	Australia	July 2023 – March 2026

== Teams and Committees ==
Teams and committees are made up of volunteers to perform the day-to-day tasks within the WCA. The following teams and committees support the WCA:

- WCA Appeals Committee (WAC)
- WCA Archive Team (WAT)
- WCA Communication Team (WCT)
- WCA Competition Announcement Team (WCAT)
- WCA Executive Assistants Team (WEAT)
- WCA Financial Committee (WFC)
- WCA Integrity Committee (WIC)
- WCA Major Championships Team (WMCT)
- WCA Marketing Team (WMT)
- WCA Quality Assurance Committee (WQAC)
- WCA Regulations Committee (WRC)
- WCA Results Team (WRT)
- WCA Software Team (WST)
- WCA Sports Organization Team (WSOT)

The responsibilities of each team or committee are found on the WCA website.

== Delegates ==
WCA Delegates are responsible for overseeing competitions and ensure they run according to the WCA regulations. The WCA recognizes Senior, Regional, Full, Junior, and Trainee Delegates. Senior and Regional delegates take on additional responsibilities in managing the delegates in their region.

Junior Delegates are required to spend at least one year in the position and demonstrate proficiency in managing competitions before being promoted to Full Delegate. Trainee Delegates are being trained to become Junior Delegates, and are not allowed to manage competitions on their own.

== History ==
=== Pre-history (1999–2003) ===
In 1982, an unofficial Rubik's Cube World Championships was hosted in Budapest, Hungary by Ernő Rubik, which was won by Minh Thai with a time of 22.95 seconds. In 1999, speedcubers gathered on the Internet via Rubik's Games, a computer game with an electronic version of the Rubik's Cube. Chris Hardwick from Raleigh, NC founded the Yahoo! Group "Speedsolvingrubikscube" and the Unofficial World Records, a place where cubers could post their personal best times. Ron van Bruchem started speedcubing.com together with his friend Ton Dennenbroek, an avid puzzle collector.

=== Founding (2003–2004) ===
Because the cubers were living all over the world, they wanted to organize a competition at which they could all meet. In 2001, plans to organise a World Championship in New York were underway but it had to be called off due to safety concerns at the time. In 2003, under the guidance of Dan Gosbee, they successfully organized the Rubik's Cube World Championship in Toronto. This first modern-age Rubik's Cube competition was a success, but there were many issues, largely due to the lack of any regulations. After the World Championship, van Bruchem and Tyson Mao started organizing competitions in the Netherlands and Germany, as well as at Caltech in the United States. In 2004, they started the World Cube Association, which today has held competitions in more than 100 countries.

After the founding of the WCA, most competitions in the United States happened in prestigious colleges, though many happened in smaller high schools, middle schools, hotels, malls, amusement parks and other venues internationally. Some of the first official events included most current ones (see Events). However, 6x6, 7x7, and Skewb weren't events when the organization was founded, whereas Magic, Master Magic, and 3x3 with Feet were but are no longer events.

== Events ==
Currently, the WCA offers competitions in 17 events. Not all events are offered at every competition, but all are usually offered at national, continental, and global championships. The events are:

- 3x3x3 Cube
- 2x2x2 Cube
- 4x4x4 Cube
- 5x5x5 Cube
- 6x6x6 Cube
- 7x7x7 Cube
- 3x3x3 Blindfolded (3BLD)
- 3x3x3 Fewest Moves (FMC)
- 3x3x3 One-Handed (OH)
- Face Turning Octahedron (from 2 January 2027)
- Megaminx
- Pyraminx
- Skewb
- Square-1
- 4x4x4 Blindfolded (4BLD)
- 5x5x5 Blindfolded (5BLD)
- 3x3x3 Multi-Blind (MBLD)

Additionally, some events have had their official WCA event status removed. They are:

- 3x3x3 Multi-Blind Old Style
- Clock (from 25 July 2027)
  - Removed with the addition of Face Turning Octohedron
- Magic
- Master Magic
- 3x3x3 With Feet
  - Removed due to lack of interest, and cleanliness of equipment.

== World Records ==
The following are the official speedcubing world records approved by the WCA as of 21 November 2026.

Note: For averages of 5 solves, the best time and the worst time are dropped, and the mean of the remaining 3 solves is taken. For events where only 3 solves are done, the mean of all 3 is taken. (Times in parentheses are not included in the average calculation)

Event	Type	Result	Person	Competition (Date(s))	Round Results
3x3x3 Cube	Single	2.51	(China) Xuanyi Geng (耿暄一)	Guangzhou Grand Open 2026 (4–5 October 2026)	(2.51) / 3.99 / 3.21 / 4.42 / (4.75)
3x3x3 Cube	Average	3.51	(China) Yiheng Wang (王艺衡)	Hefei Cubing League 3x3 III 2026 (17 June 2026)	3.68 / (4.61) / (3.39) / 3.41 / 3.45
2x2x2 Cube	Single	0.39	(China) Ziyu Ye (叶梓渝)	Hefei Open 2025 (25 October 2025)	(1.94) / 1.31 / 1.38 / 1.46 / (0.39)
2x2x2 Cube	Average	0.86	(United States) Sujan Feist	Kids America Christmas Clash OH 2025 (13 December 2025)	0.86 / 1.02 / (0.56) / (1.42) / 0.70
2x2x2 Cube	Average	0.86	(United States) Sujan Feist	Cubing the Coast MS 2026 (22 August 2026)	0.85 / (2.97) / 0.81 / 0.91 / (0.66)
2x2x2 Cube	Average	0.86	(Poland) Teodor Zajder	Polish Championship 2026 (20-22 November 2026)	0.81 / (0.77) / (1.08) / 0.89 / 0.89
4x4x4 Cube	Single	15.18	(Poland) Tymon Kolasiński	Spanish Championship 2025 (6–8 December 2025)	20.27 / (22.54) / 19.57 / (15.18) / 20.34
4x4x4 Cube	Average	18.46	(Poland) Tymon Kolasiński	Seoul Winter 2026 (17–18 January 2026)	19.16 / 18.01 / 18.51 / (21.64) / (16.09)
5x5x5 Cube	Single	29.49	(Poland) Tymon Kolasiński	All Rounders Katowice I 2026 (1–3 May 2026)	33.43 / (29.49) 33.21 / 34.56 / (35.52)
5x5x5 Cube	Average	32.09	(Russia) Timofei Tarasenko	Guangzhou Grand Open 2026 (4-5 October 2026)	35.42 / 31.87 / (37.15) / (30.90) / 32.28
6x6x6 Cube	Single	57.69	(United States) Max Park	Burbank Big Cubes 2025 (26 April 2025)	57.69 / 1:11.14 / 1:09.39
6x6x6 Cube	Mean	1:06.76	(Russia) Timofei Tarasenko	Beijing Autumn Rivalry 2026 (30–2 October 2026)	1:02.64 / 1:01.63 / 1:01.00
7x7x7 Cube	Single	1:27.47	(Russia) Timofei Tarasenko	Beijing Autumn Rivalry 2026 (30–2 October 2026)	1:37.95 / 1:27.47 / 1:42.37
7x7x7 Cube	Mean	1:35.93	(Russia) Timofei Tarasenko	Beijing Autumn Rivalry 2026 (30–2 October 2026)	1:37.95 / 1:27.47 / 1:42.37
3x3x3 Blindfolded	Single	11.56	(United States) Tommy Cherry	Mid-Atlantic Quiet Championship 2026 (27–28 June 2026)	15.98 / 14.26 / (11.56) / 14.95 / (DNF)
3x3x3 Blindfolded	Mean	13.97	(United States) Tommy Cherry	Hefei August Open 2026 (15 August 2026)	13.68 / 14.48 / (13.60) / 13.75 / (15.87)
3x3x3 Fewest Moves	Single	16	(Italy) Sebastiano Tronto	FMC 2019 (15–16 June 2019)	16 / 26 / 24
3x3x3 Fewest Moves	Single	16	(United States) Aedan Bryant	Ashfield Summer Challenge 2024 (23 June 2024)	26 / 16 / 26
3x3x3 Fewest Moves	Single	16	(United States) Levi Gibson	Ashfield Summer Challenge 2024 (23 June 2024)	26 / 16 / 24
3x3x3 Fewest Moves	Single	16	(United Kingdom) Jacob Sherwen Brown	Rubik's UK Championship FMC 2024 (26 October 2024)	33 / 31 / 16
3x3x3 Fewest Moves	Single	16	(Slovakia) Riccardo Raciti	FMC Italy 2026 (21 November 2026)	DNF / DNF / 16
3x3x3 Fewest Moves	Mean	19.00	(United States) Brian Johnson	Evanston FMC Spring 2026 (2 May 2026)	17 / 18 / 22
3x3x3 One-Handed	Single	5.62	(United States) Patrick Ponce	Mid-Atlantic Speedcubing Championship 2026 (14–16 August 2026)	10.79 / 13.99 / (5.62) / 8.46 / (16.35)
3x3x3 One-Handed	Average	6.99	(China) Zhen Chen (陈震)	Wuhu Open 2026 (25 July 2026)	7.27 / 7.07 / (6.12) / (9.48) / 6.64
Clock	Single	1.53	(New Zealand) Lachlan Gibson	Hasty Hastings 2025 (27 September 2025)	3.52 / 2.33 / (7.02) / (1.53) / 3.08
Clock	Average	2.14	(New Zealand) Lachlan Gibson	GAN New Zealand Nationals 2026 (10-12 July 2026)	2.10 / (2.07) / 2.22 / 2.09 / (2.33)
Megaminx	Single	21.04	(China) Ziyu Wu (吴子钰)	Quanzhou Summer 2026 (30 May 2026)	(21.04) / 27.74 / 28.66 / 26.11 / (29.29)
Megaminx	Average	23.40	(Russia) Timofei Tarasenko	Kuala Lumpur Cubing Challenge 2026 (22-23 August 2026)	(22.47) / (24.29) / 23.57 / 23.73 / 22.91
Pyraminx	Single	0.70	(United States) Clem Tucker	Dobbs Ferry Decathlon 2026 (12-13 November 2026)	1.65 / 1.62 / (4.68) / 1.84 / (0.70)
Pyraminx	Average	1.14	(China) Lingkun Jiang (姜凌坤)	Zhengzhou Zest 2025 (27 December 2025)	1.04 / (3.22) / (0.97) / 1.21 / 1.16
Skewb	Single	0.73	(Czech Republic) Vojtěch Grohmann	Głuszyca Open 2026 (7–8 March 2026)	(3.25) / 1.57 / 1.70 / (0.73) / 1.56
Skewb	Average	1.37	(Poland) Ignacy Samselski	Cube Factory League Justynów 2025 (14–15 June 2025)	1.22 / 1.43 / (1.16) / 1.46 / (2.93)
Square-1	Single	2.85	(United States) Brian Johnson	Evanston Qualifier 2026 (17 May 2026)	(2.85) / 4.39 / (9.36) / 6.40 / 5.23
Square-1	Average	4.63	(United States) Sameer Aggarwal	Cubing in Southern Oregon 2025 (1 February 2025)	(8.08) / 6.20 / (3.42) / 3.81 / 3.88
4x4x4 Blindfolded	Single	51.96	(United States) Stanley Chapel	4BLD in a Madison Hall 2023 (28–29 January 2023)	1:17.62 / DNF / 51.96
4x4x4 Blindfolded	Mean	59.39	(United States) Stanley Chapel	New York Multimate PBQ II 2025 (13–15 June 2025)	57.83 / 1:04.79 / 55.54
5x5x5 Blindfolded	Single	1:58.59	(United States) Stanley Chapel	Multi Mayhem VA 2026 (2–4 January 2026)	2:22.85 / DNF / 1:58.59
5x5x5 Blindfolded	Mean	2:27.63	(United States) Stanley Chapel	Michigan Cubing Club Epsilon 2019 (14 December 2019)	2:32.48 / 2:28.80 / 2:21.62
3x3x3 Multi-Blind	Single	63/65 58:23	(United States) Graham Siggins	Please Be Quiet Reno 2025 (18 October 2025)	63/65 58:23 / 58/68 1:00:00

== World Championships ==
Every two years starting from 2003, the WCA holds the Rubik's Cube World Championships. (except for the 2021 World Championships, which was cancelled due to the Covid-19 pandemic.) The Championship ultimately determines the world champion of the puzzle. Every official event is held at the Championship. The Rubik's Cube World Championship requires extremely careful planning by several volunteers, as well as a large financial commitment to reserve the venue and make necessary preparations. The latest championship was held in Seattle, United States from 3rd to 6th of July 2025. The next Championship is scheduled to be held in Uppsala, Sweden from 22nd to 25th of July 2027. The 2021 World Championship was to be held in Almere, Amsterdam from 28th to 31st of December 2021, already delayed from its initial July dates due to the COVID-19 pandemic, before being ultimately cancelled by the association in August 2021.

Championship	Year	Host	Date(s)	Nations	Puzzles	Events	3x3 Winner	Average	Ref
I	1982	(Hungary) Budapest	5 June	19	1	1	(United States) Minh Thai	22.95 (Note: The 1982 World Championship used a best of 3 method to determine the winner, so Minh Thai's winning time is actually a single time.)	
II	2003	(Canada) Toronto	23–24 August	15	9	14	(United States) Dan Knights	20.00	
III	2005	(United States) Lake Buena Vista	5–6 November	16	9	15	(France) Jean Pons	15.10	
IV	2007	(Hungary) Budapest	5–7 October	28	10	17	(Japan) Yu Nakajima	12.46	
V	2009	(Germany) Düsseldorf	9–11 October	32	12	19	(United Kingdom) Breandan Vallance	10.74	
VI	2011	(Thailand) Bangkok	14–16 October	35	12	19	(Poland) Michał Pleskowicz	8.65	
VII	2013	(United States) Las Vegas	26–28 July	35	10	17	(Australia) Feliks Zemdegs	8.18	
VIII	2015	(Brazil) São Paulo	17–19 July	37	11	18	(Australia) Feliks Zemdegs	7.56	
IX	2017	(France) Paris	13–16 July	64	11	18	(United States) Max Park	6.85	
X	2019	(Australia) Melbourne	11–14 July	52	11	18	(Germany) Philipp Weyer	6.74	
-	2021	(Netherlands) Almere	Cancelled	-	11	17	-	-	
XI	2023	(South Korea) Incheon	12–15 August	57	11	17	(United States) Max Park	5.31	
XII	2025	(United States) Seattle	3–6 July	74	11	17	(China) Yiheng Wang	4.23	
XIII	2027	(Sweden) Uppsala	22–25 July	-	-	-	-	-	

== See also ==
- Rubik's Cube
- Speedcubing
