= Rubik's Revenge =

4×4×4 Rubik's cube variation

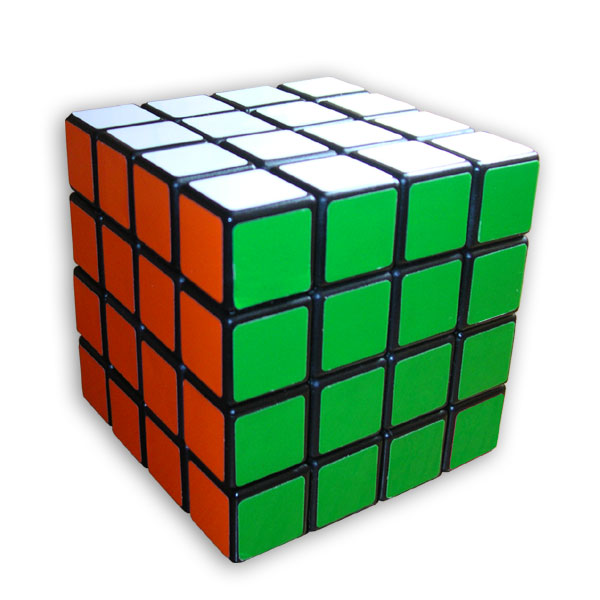
A solved Rubik's Revenge cube

The Rubik's Revenge (also known as the 4×4×4 Rubik's Cube) is a 4×4×4 version of the Rubik's Cube. It was released in 1981. Invented by Péter Sebestény, the cube was nearly called the Sebestiny Cube until a somewhat last-minute decision changed the puzzle's name to attract fans of the original Rubik's Cube. Unlike the original puzzle (and other puzzles with an odd number of layers like the 5×5×5 cube), it has no fixed faces: the center pieces (four per face) are free to move to different positions.

Methods for solving the 3×3×3 cube work for the edges and corners of the 4×4×4 cube, as long as one has correctly identified the relative positions of the colours—since the center faces can no longer be used for identification.(Also known as Yau method)

== Mechanics ==
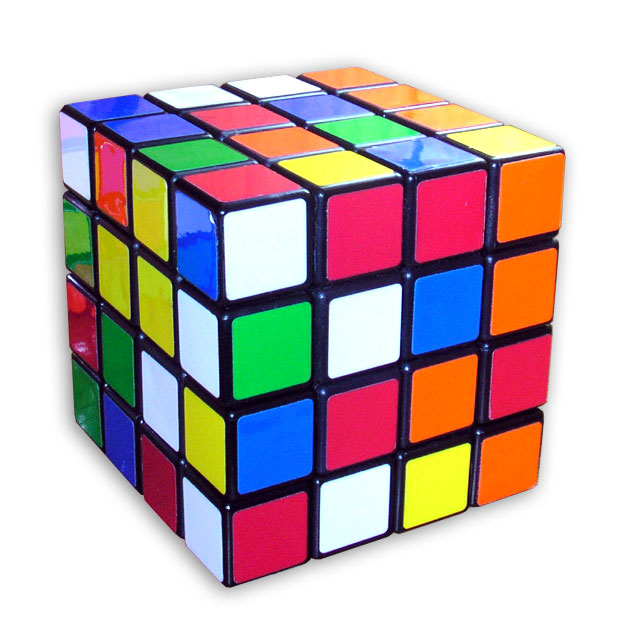
A scrambled Rubik's Revenge cube

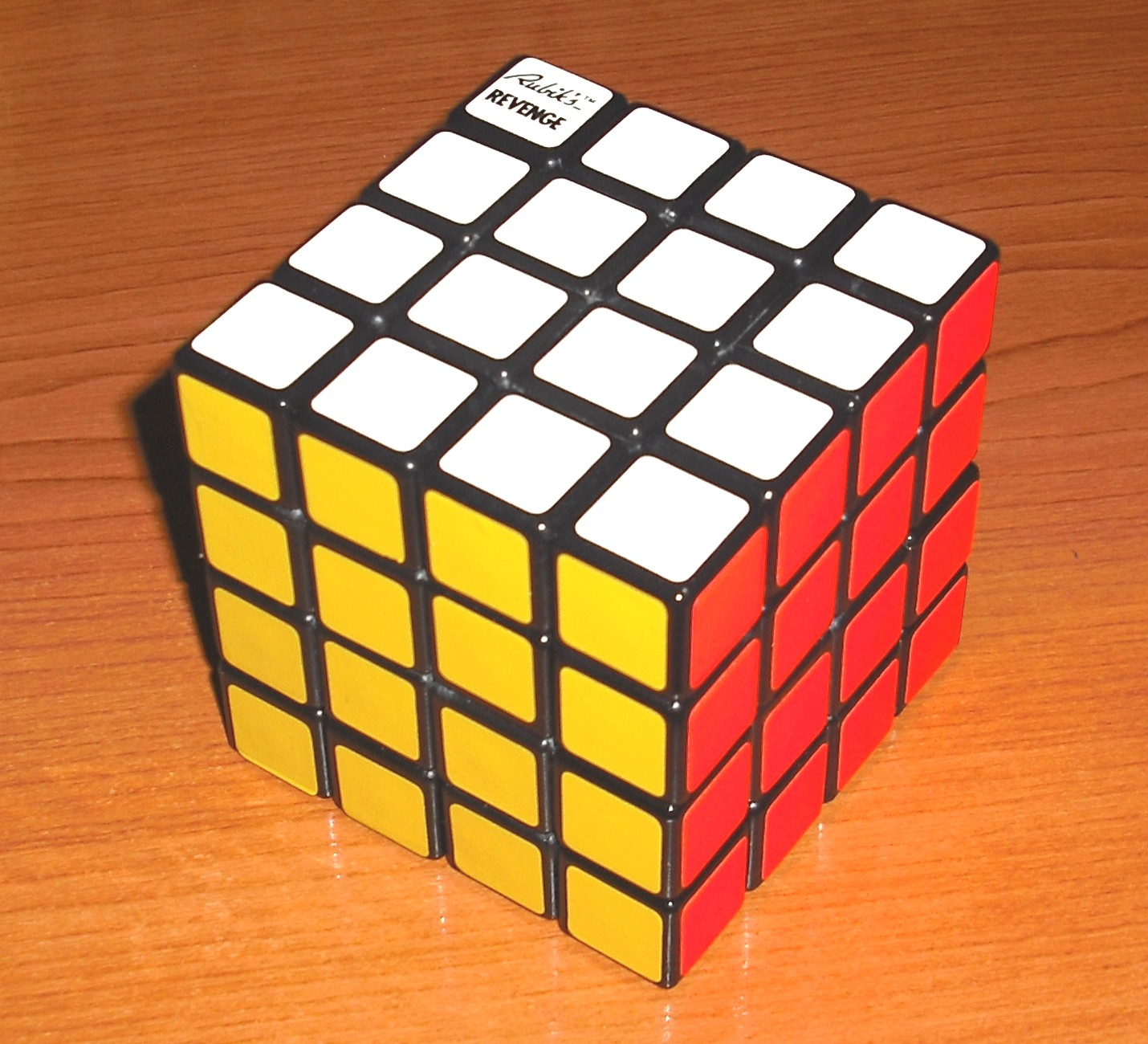
Early Rubik's Revenge cube, with white opposite blue, and yellow opposite green

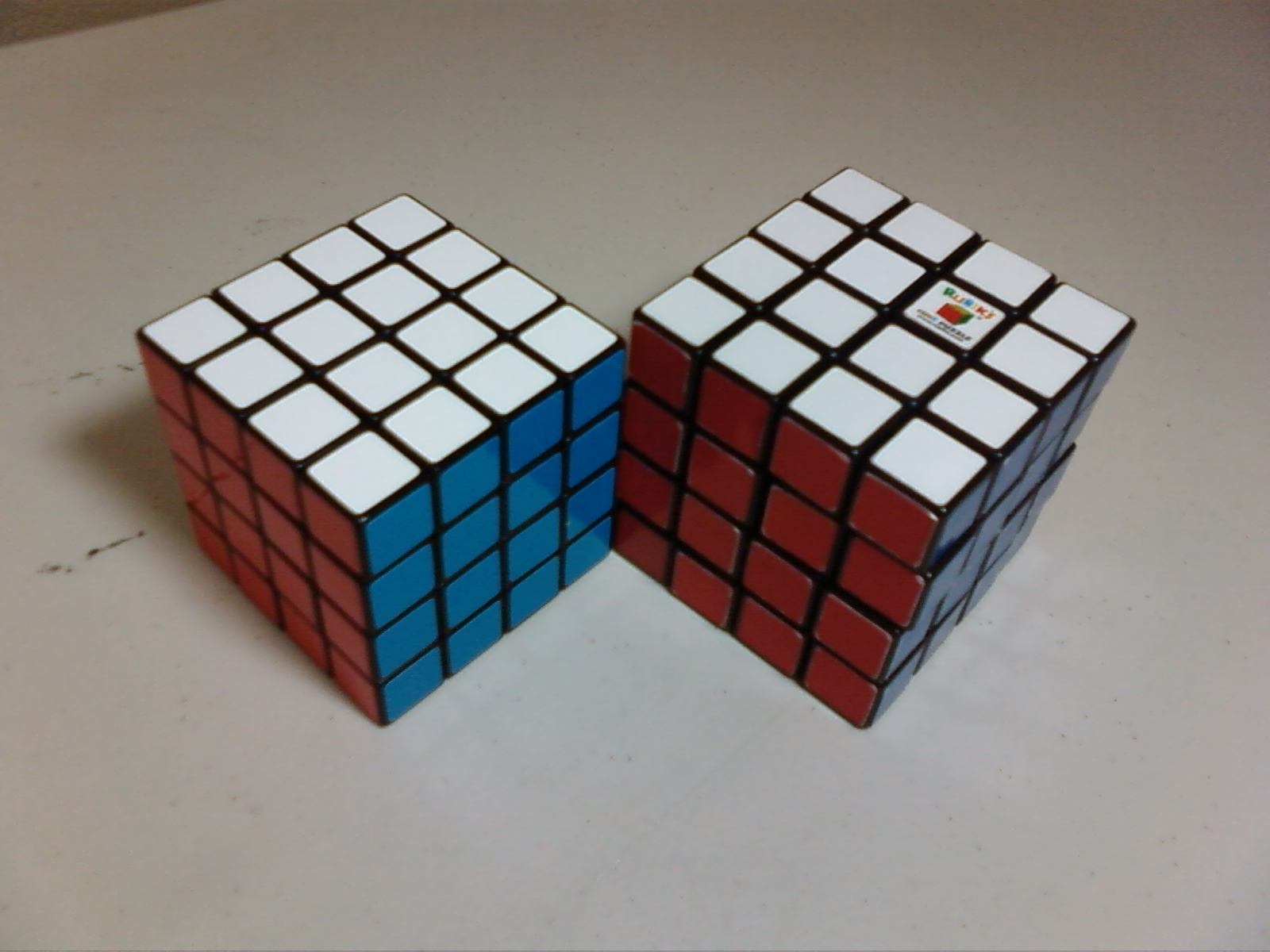
Eastsheen cube on the left, official Rubik's Revenge on the right

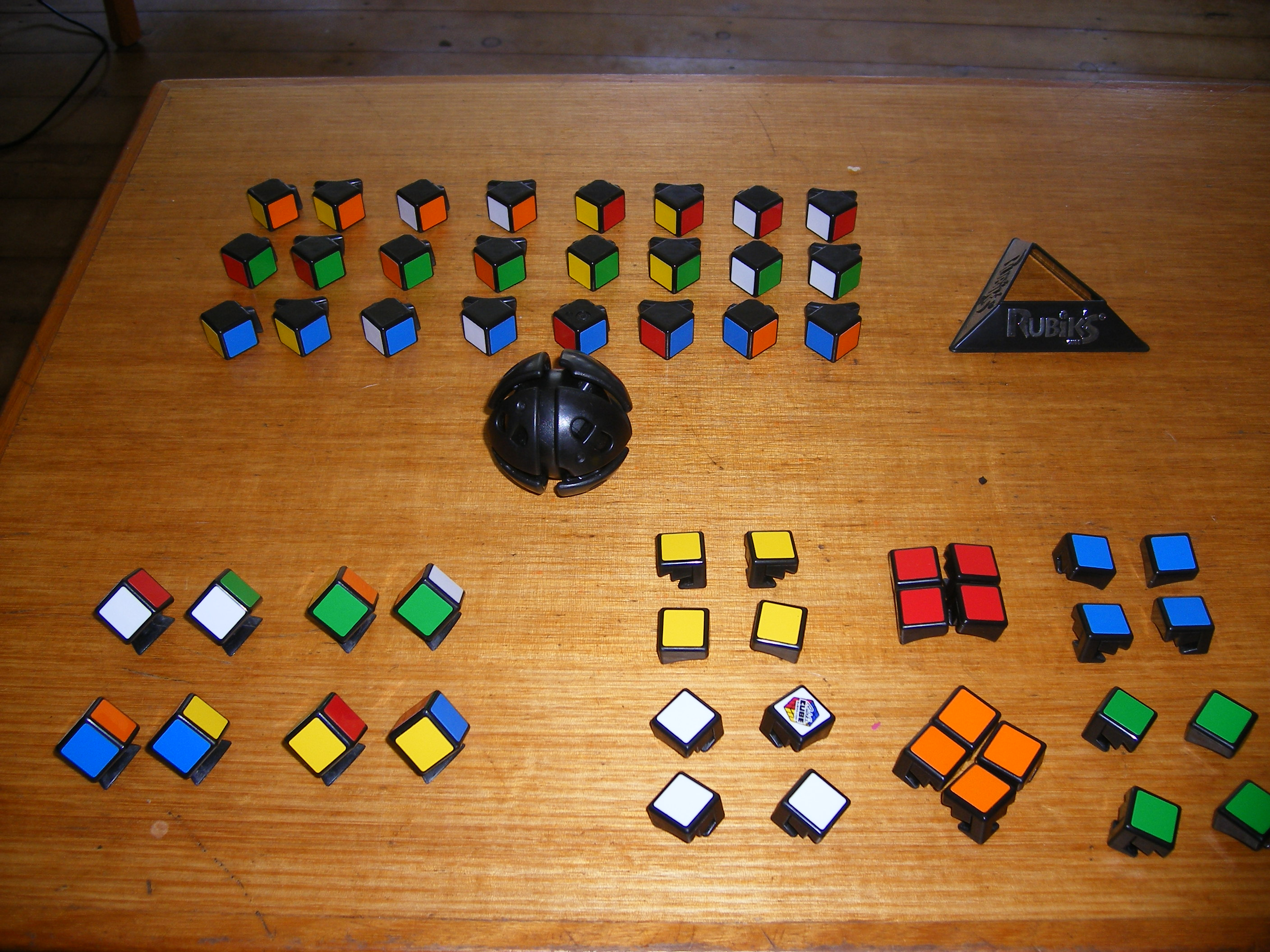
A disassembled Rubik's Revenge, showing all the pieces and central ball

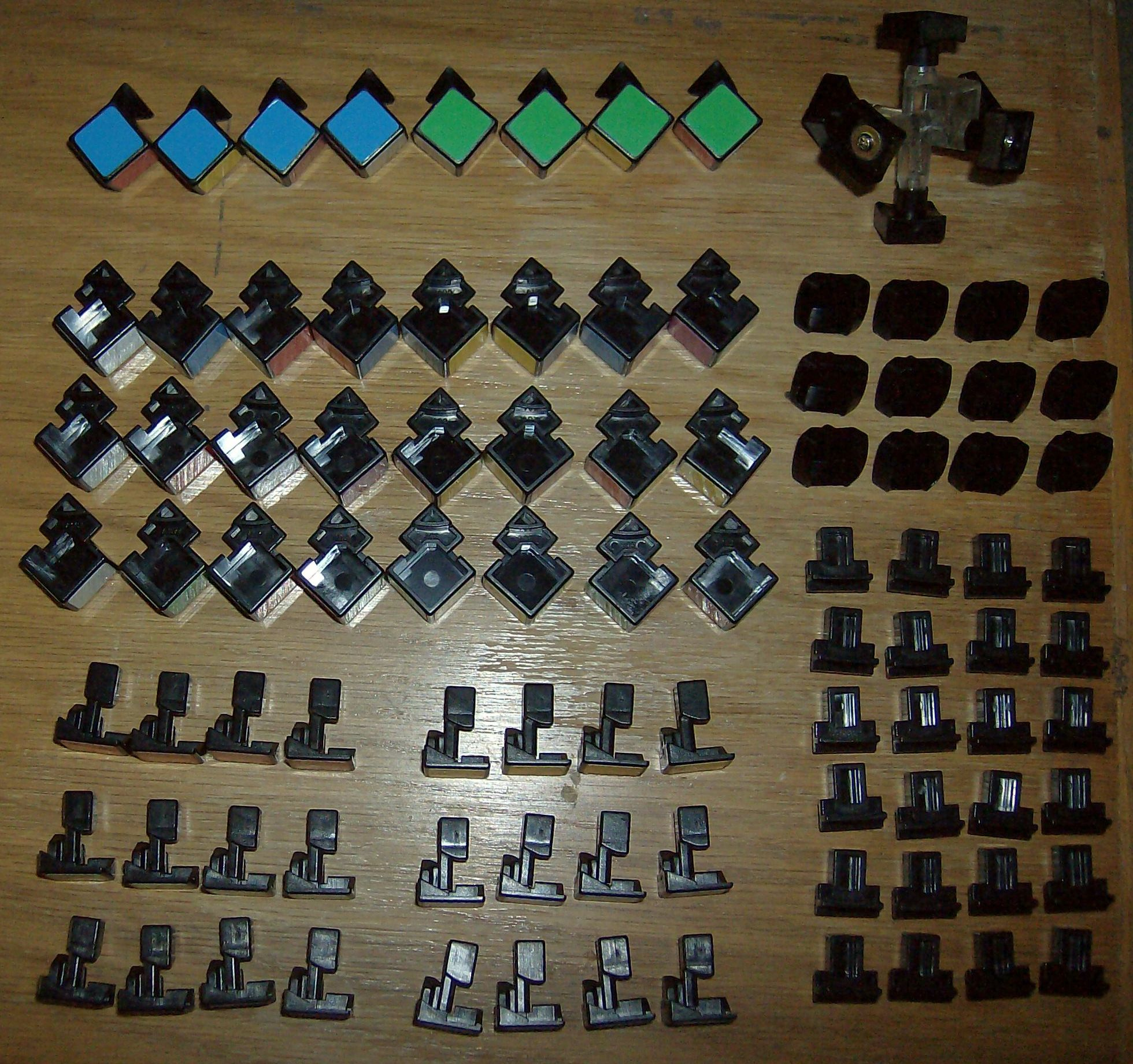
A disassembled Eastsheen cube

The puzzle consists of 56 unique miniature cubes ("cubies") on the surface. These consist of 24 centres which show one colour each, 24 edges which show two colours each, and 8 corners which show three colours each. The original Rubik's Revenge can be taken apart without much difficulty, typically by turning one side to a 45° angle and prying an edge upward until it dislodges.

The original mechanism designed by Sebestény uses a grooved ball to hold the centre pieces in place. The edge pieces are held in place by the centres and the corners are held in place by the edges, much like the original cube. There are three mutually perpendicular grooves for the centre pieces to slide through. Each groove is only wide enough to allow one row of centre pieces to slide through it. The ball is shaped to prevent the centre pieces of the other row from sliding, ensuring that the ball remains aligned with the outside of the cube. Turning one of the centre layers moves either just that layer or the ball as well.

The Eastsheen version of the cube, which is slightly smaller at 6cm to an edge, has a completely different mechanism. Eastsheen's mechanism is very similar to their version of the Professor's cube, instead of the ball-core mechanism. There are 42 pieces (36 movable and six fixed) completely hidden within the cube, corresponding to the centre rows on the Professor's Cube. This design is more durable than the original and also allows for screws to be used to tighten or loosen the cube. The central spindle is specially shaped to prevent it from becoming misaligned with the exterior of the cube. Nearly all manufacturers of 4×4×4 use similar mechanisms.

There are 24 edge pieces which show two coloured sides each, and eight corner pieces which show three colours. Each corner piece or pair of edge pieces shows a unique colour combination, but not all combinations are present (for example, there is no piece with both red and orange sides, if red and orange are on opposite sides of the solved Cube). The location of these cubes relative to one another can be altered by twisting the layers of the cube, but the location of the coloured sides relative to one another in the completed state of the puzzle cannot be altered: it is fixed by the relative positions of the centre squares and the distribution of colour combinations on edge and corner pieces. Edge pairs are often referred to as "dedges," from double edges.

For most recent cubes, the colours of the stickers are red opposite orange, yellow opposite white, and green opposite blue. However, there also exist cubes with alternative colour arrangements (yellow opposite green, blue opposite white and red opposite orange). The Eastsheen version has purple (opposite red) instead of orange.

=== Permutations ===
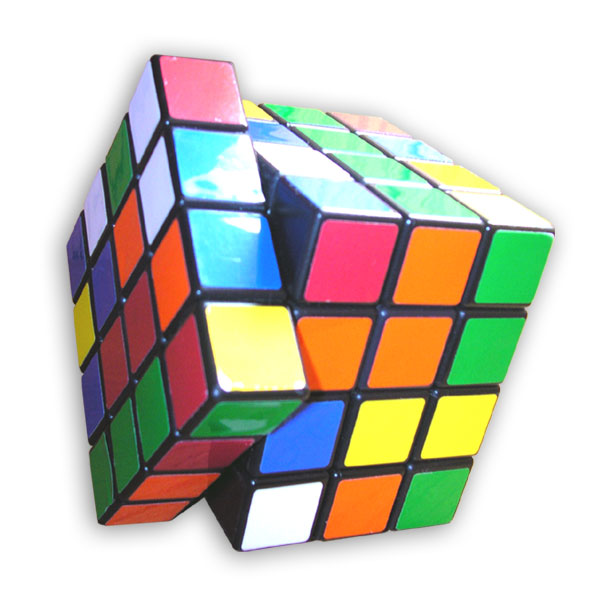
Scrambled and partially turned

There are 8 corners, 24 edges and 24 centres.

Any permutation of the corners is possible, including odd permutations. Seven of the corners can be independently rotated, and the orientation of the eighth depends on the other seven, giving 8!×3^{7} combinations.

There are 24 centres, which can be arranged in 24! different ways. Assuming that the four centres of each colour are indistinguishable, the number of permutations is reduced to 24!/(24^{6}) arrangements. The reducing factor comes about because there are 24 (4!) ways to arrange the four pieces of a given colour. This is raised to the sixth power because there are six colours. An odd permutation of the corners implies an odd permutation of the centres and vice versa; however, even and odd permutations of the centres are indistinguishable due to the identical appearance of the pieces. There are several ways to make the centre pieces distinguishable, which would make an odd centre permutation visible.

The 24 edges cannot be flipped, due to the internal shape of the pieces. Corresponding edges are distinguishable, since they are mirror images of each other. Any permutation of the edges is possible, including odd permutations, giving 24! arrangements, independently of the corners or centres.

Assuming the cube does not have a fixed orientation in space, and that the permutations resulting from rotating the cube without twisting it are considered identical, the number of permutations is reduced by a factor of 24. This is because all 24 possible positions and orientations of the first corner are equivalent because of the lack of fixed centres. This factor does not appear when calculating the permutations of N×N×N cubes where N is odd, since those puzzles have fixed centres which identify the cube's spatial orientation.

This gives a total number of permutations of

$$\frac{8! \times 3^7 \times 24!^2}{24^7} \approx 7.40 \times 10^{45}.$$

The full number is 7401196841564901869874093974498574336000000000 possible permutations (about 7401 septillion, 7.4 septilliard on the long scale or 7.4 quattuordecillion on the short scale).

Some models of the cube have one of the centre pieces marked with a logo, distinguishing it from the other three of the same colour. Since there are four distinguishable positions for this piece, the number of permutations is quadrupled, yielding 2.96×10^{46} possibilities. Any of the four possible positions for this piece could be regarded as correct.

== Solutions ==
There are several methods that can be used to solve the puzzle. One such method is the reduction method, so called because it effectively reduces the 4×4×4 to a 3×3×3. Cubers first group the centre pieces of common colours together, then pair edges that show the same two colours. Once this is done, turning only the outer layers of the cube allows it to be solved like a 3×3×3 cube.

Another method is the Yau method, named after Robert Yau. The Yau method is similar to the reduction method, and it is the most common method used by speedcubers. The Yau method starts by solving two centers on opposite sides. Three cross dedges are then solved. Next, the four remaining centers are solved. Afterwards, any remaining edges are solved. This reduces the 4×4×4 down to a 3×3×3 cube.

A method similar to the Yau method is called Hoya. It was invented by Jong-Ho Jeong. It involves the same steps as Yau, but in a different order. It starts with all centers being solved except for 2 adjacent centers. Then form a cross on the bottom, then solve the last two centers. After this, it is identical to Yau, finishing the edges, and solving the cube as a 3×3.

=== Parity errors ===
When reducing the 4×4×4 to a 3×3×3, certain positions that cannot be solved on a standard 3×3×3 cube may be reached. There are two possible problems not found on the 3×3×3. The first is two edge pieces reversed on one edge, resulting in the colours of that edge not matching the rest of the cubies on either face (OLL parity):

The second is two edge pairs being swapped with each other (PLL parity), which also can be two corners swapped instead, depending on situation and/or method:

These situations are known as parity errors. These positions are still solvable; however, special algorithms must be applied to fix the errors.

Some methods are designed to avoid the parity errors described above. For instance, solving the corners and edges first and the centres last would avoid such parity errors. Once the rest of the cube is solved, any permutation of the centre pieces can be solved. Note that it is possible to exchange a pair of face centres by cycling 3 face centres, two of which are visually identical.

Direct solving of a 4×4×4 is uncommon, but possible, with methods such as K4. Doing so mixes a variety of techniques and is heavily reliant on commutators for the final steps.

== World records ==
The world record for single solve is 15.18 seconds, set by Tymon Kolasiński of Poland on December 7th, 2025 at Spanish Championship 2025 in Tarragona, Spain.

The world record for Olympic average of five solves is 18.74 seconds, set by Tymon Kolasiński of Poland on January 17-18th 2025 at Seoul Winter 2026 in Seoul, South Korea, with times of 19.16, 18.01, 18.51, 21.64, and 16.09 seconds.

The world record for fastest blindfolded solve is 51.96 seconds (including inspection), set by Stanley Chapel of the United States on January 28th 2023 at 4BLD in a Madison Hall 2023, in Madison, Wisconsin.

The world record for mean of three blindfolded solves is 59.39 seconds (including inspection), also set by Stanley Chapel of the United States on June 13, 2025 at New York Multimate PBQ II 2025, in Elmsford, New York with times of 57.83, 1:04.79, and 55.54 seconds.

=== Top 10 solvers by single solve ===
Rank	Name	Result	Competition
1	(Poland) Tymon Kolasiński	15.18s	(Spain) Spanish Championship 2025
2	(United States) Max Park	15.71s	(United States) Colorado Mountain Tour - Evergreen 2024
3	(Germany) Sebastian Weyer	16.41s	(France) Questem'paire 2026
4	(Philippines) Leo Borromeo	16.52s	(Philippines) Makati Speedcubing Open IV 2025
5	(United States) Ray Bai	16.84s	(United States) Texas Championship 2025
6	(Russia) Timofei Tarasenko	16.95s	Uzbekistan Nationals 2025
7	(China) Bofan Zhang (张博藩)	16.97s	(China) Nanchang Summer 2026
8	(South Korea) Seung Hyuk Nahm (남승혁)	17.05s	(South Korea) Cube Camp in Jeju 2026
9	(United States) Matty Hiroto Inaba	17.10s	(United States) Honolulu Hoʻoilo 2025
10	(Vietnam) Đỗ Quang Hưng	17.46s	(Vietnam) MYHM HaNxNoi 2026

=== Top 10 solvers by Olympic average of 5 solves ===
Rank	Name	Result	Competition	Times
1	(Poland) Tymon Kolasiński	18.56s	(South Korea) Seoul Winter 2026	19.16, 18.01, 18.51, (21.64), (16.09)
2	(United States) Max Park	18.74s	(United States) Mission Viejo Fall 2025	(20.00), 18.79, 17.76, 19.68, (17.08)
3	(Russia) Timofei Tarasenko	19.02s	(China) Beijing Autumn Rivalry 2026	19.87, (20.26), 19.41, (17.70), 17.78
4	(Germany) Sebastian Weyer	19.63s	(France) Tigery Open 2026	(20.56), 20.39, 19.55, (18.34), 18.94
5	(Vietnam) Đỗ Quang Hưng	20.02s	(Vietnam) MYHM HaNxNoi 2026	(20.90), (17.46), 20.03, 19.21, 20.83
6	(China) Ruihang Xu (许瑞航)	20.23s	(China) Wuhu Open 2026	19.82, (18.73), (21.62), 20.52, 20.34
7	(United States) Matty Hiroto Inaba	20.72s	(United States) Rubik's WCA World Championship 2025	21.22, 19.91, (29.61), 21.04, (18.41)
8	(South Korea) Seung Hyuk Nahm (남승혁)	20.74s	(South Korea) Hamoye Jinju 2026	20.52, (24.05), 21.04, (20.36), 20.65
9	(Philippines) Leo Borromeo	20.81s	(Philippines) Visayas Championship 2025	(19.14), (22.72), 20.30, 21.22, 20.92
10	(Netherlands) Twan Dullemond	21.25s	(Netherlands) Quick 'n Slick Meppel 2025	22.74, (19.64), 20.06, 20.96, (25.12)

=== Top 10 solvers by single solve blindfolded ===
Rank	Name	Result	Competition
1	(United States) Stanley Chapel	51.96s	(United States) 4BLD in a Madison Hall 2023
2	(Austria) Simon Praschl	57.79s	(Austria) Austrian Nationals 2026
3	(Malaysia) Hill Pong Yong Feng	1:01.01	Singapore Championship 2023
4	(United Kingdom) Ryan Eckersley	1:07.48	(United Kingdom) Glasgow Spring - Scottish Blind Off 2025
5	(China) Kaijun Lin (林恺俊)	1:09.98	(Malaysia) Please Be Quiet Bukit Jalil 2023
6	(Sweden) Daniel Wallin	1:12.45	(Sweden) Norrlandsmästerskapet 2025
7	(Switzerland) Ezra Hirschi	1:15.76	(Switzerland) BL&D BLD Liestal 2026
8	(Argentina) Manuel Gutman	1:16.43	(Canada) Championnat Canadien 2025
9	(South Korea) Yeon Kyun Park (박연균)	1:17.05	(South Korea) Silent Korea Open 2026
10	(United States) Tommy Cherry	1:20.34	(South Korea) Rubik's WCA World Championship 2023

=== Top 10 solvers by mean of 3 solves blindfolded ===
Rank	Name	Result	Competition	Times
1	(United States) Stanley Chapel	59.39s	(United States) New York Multimate PBQ II 2025	57.83, 1:04.79, 55.54
2	(Austria) Simon Praschln	1:07.83	(Austria) Austrian Nationals 2026	57.79, 1:10.00, 1:15.69
3	(Malaysia) Hill Pong Yong Feng	1:13.60	(Malaysia) Selangor PBQ 2026	1:11.02, 1:11.16, 1:18.62
4	(China) Kaijun Lin (林恺俊)	1:20.08	(China) Guangdong Open 2021	1:19.22, 1:19.07, 1:21.94
5	(United Kingdom) Ryan Eckersley	1:22.99	(United Kingdom) Liverpool Spring 2026	1:20.02, 1:28.24, 1:20.71
6	(Argentina) Manuel Gutman	1:26.75	(Argentina) Nacionales Argentinas 2023	1:20.63, 1:25.93, 1:33.68
7	(Sweden) Daniel Wallin	1:30.79	(Sweden) Fyris Side 'n Blind 2022	1:23.27, 1:25.83, 1:43.26
8	(Switzerland) Ezra Hirschi	1:35.91	(Switzerland) Swisscubing Cup Mental Breakdown I 2024	1:34.29, 1:34.87, 1:38.57
9	(Australia) Michael Tripodi	1:39.39	(United States) Rubik's WCA World Championship 2025	1:41.60, 1:36.94, 1:39.62
10	(United States) Graham Siggins	1:41.67	(United States) Bay Area Slowcubin' 2025	1:37.82, 1:45.70, 1:41.50

== In popular culture ==
In "Cube Wars", an episode from the animated series Whatever Happened to... Robot Jones?, the students play a colored cube called the Wonder Cube which is similar to the Rubik's Revenge.

== Reception ==
Games included Rubik's Revenge in their "Top 100 Games of 1982", finding that it was helpful that the center pieces of the original 3×3×3 did not move, but noted "That's not true of this Supercube, which has added an extra row of subcubes in all three dimensions."

== See also ==
- Pocket Cube (2×2×2)
- Rubik's Cube (3×3×3)
- Professor's Cube (5×5×5)
- V-Cube 6 (6×6×6)
- V-Cube 7 (7×7×7)
- V-Cube 8 (8×8×8)
- Combination puzzle
