= Impossiball =

Rounded icosahedral puzzle

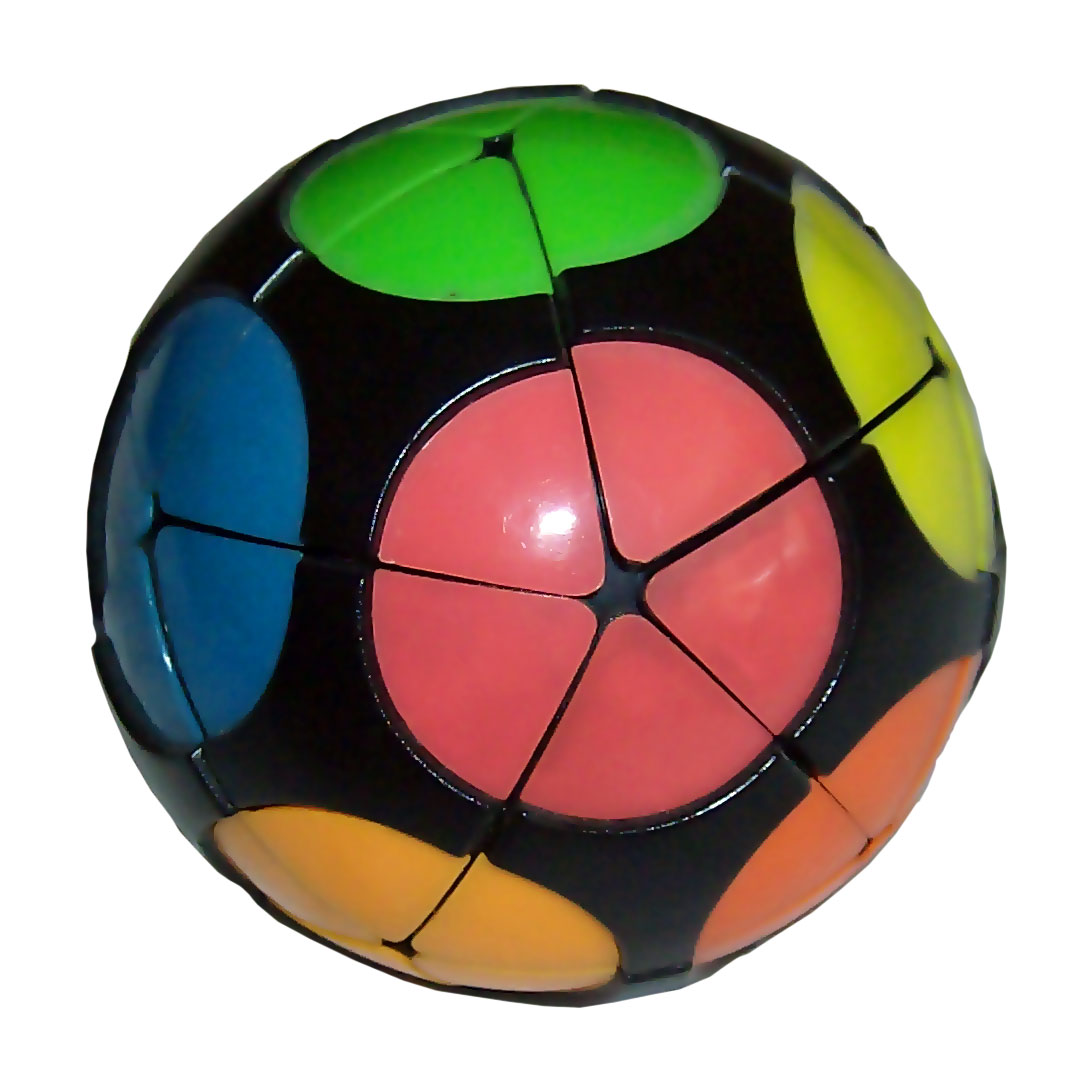
The Impossiball in its solved state.

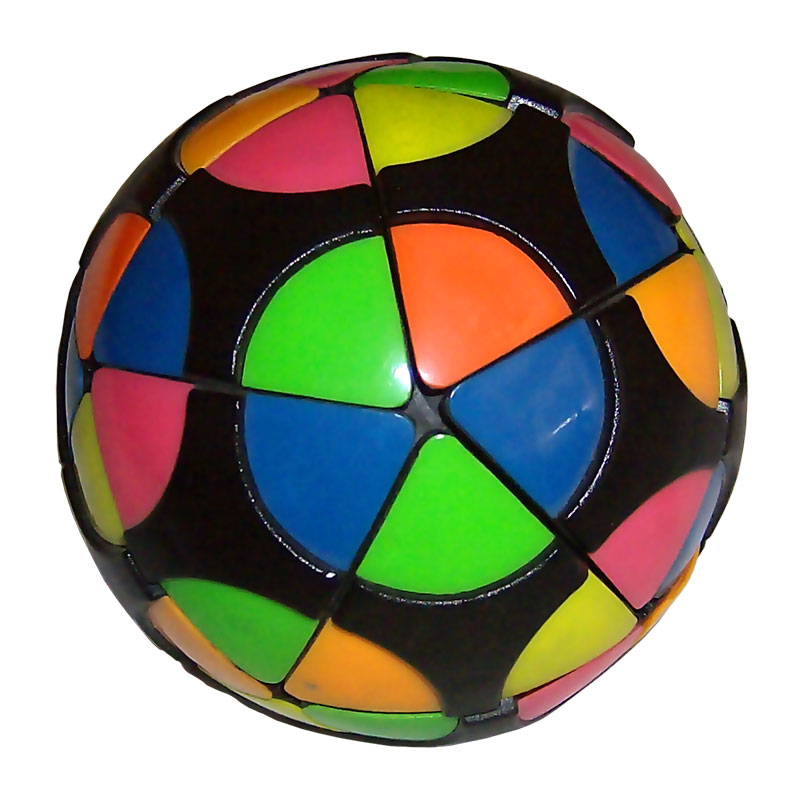
The Impossiball in a scrambled state.

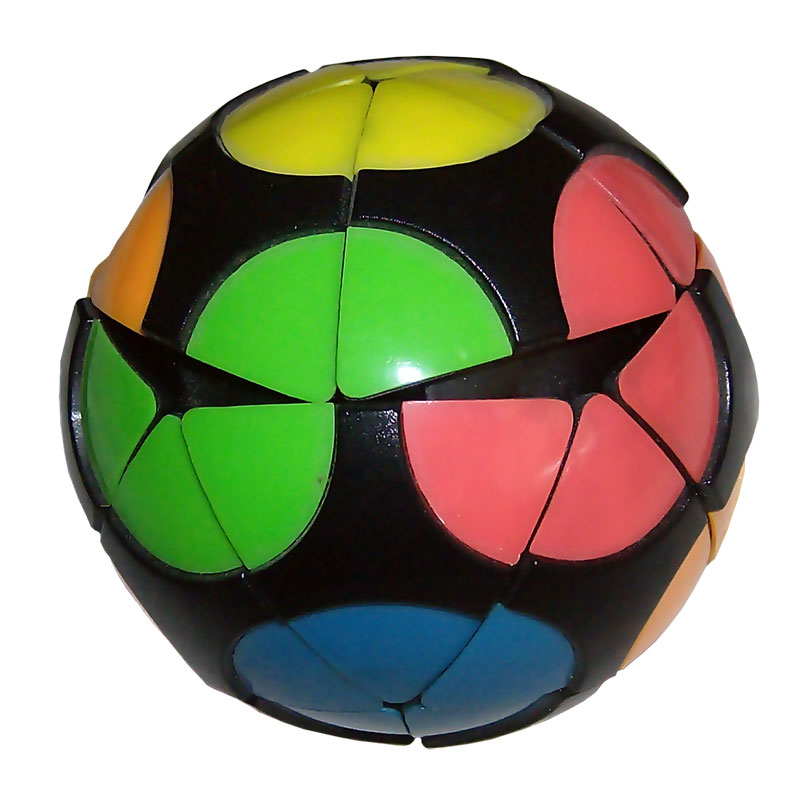
The Impossiball partway through a turn, showing how the pieces lift up.

The Impossiball is a rounded icosahedral puzzle similar to the Rubik's Cube. It has a total of 20 movable pieces to rearrange, which is the same as the Rubik's Cube, but all of the Impossiball's pieces are corners, like the Pocket Cube.

== History ==
William O. Gustafson applied for a patent for the Impossiball design in 1981 and it was issued in 1984. Uwe Mèffert eventually bought the rights to some of the patents and continues to sell it in his puzzle shop under the Impossiball moniker.

== Description ==
The Impossiball is made in the shape of an icosahedron that has been rounded out to a sphere, and has 20 pieces, all of them corners. The puzzle has twelve circles located at the vertices of the icosahedron, and on the six-color version opposite circles are the same color. Because of the rounded shape of the puzzle, the pieces move up and down as they are rotated. It is also possible to remove one piece, turning the puzzle into a spherical version of the 15 puzzle.

The purpose of the puzzle is to scramble the colors, and then restore it to its original state of having one color per circle. This puzzle is equivalent to solving just the corners of a Megaminx or solving a Kilominx. The original Impossiball had the same colors as the Rubik's Cube: red, orange, yellow, green, blue, and white. Meffert currently produces two versions, one with six colors and one with twelve. The six-color version (pictured) uses pink, two shades of orange, yellow, green, and blue. All the pieces are still distinguishable, however, because the two pieces with the same three colors are mirror images of each other. The twelve-color version has red, pink, orange, yellow, two shades of green, three shades of blue, purple, brown, and white.

== Solutions ==
The Impossiball is functionally equivalent to the Kilominx, or solving the corners of a Megaminx, just with a spherical shape. Thus, the same solutions on the Kilominx can be used on the Impossiball.

== Number of combinations ==
There are 20!/2 ways to arrange the pieces, since there is no way to create odd permutations without tampering with the puzzle. There are 3^{19} ways to orient the pieces, since the orientation of the last depends on that of the preceding ones. Since the Impossiball has no fixed face centers, this result is divided by 60. There are 60 possible positions and orientations of the first corner, but all are equivalent because of the lack of face centers.

$$\frac{20! \times 3^{19}}{120} \approx 2.36 \times 10^{25}$$

The entire number is 23563902142421896679424000 (roughly 23.6 septillion on the short scale or 23.6 quadrillion on the long scale).

== See also ==
- Rubik's Cube
- Megaminx
- Dogic
- Alexander's Star
- Tuttminx
- Combination puzzles
