= SQ1 =

SQ1 may refer to:

- Space Quest I, a 1986 video game
- SQ1, a galactic quadrant in the Milky Way
- SQ1, a mixtape by Lil Wayne
- SQ1, a Singapore Airlines flight that flies from Hong Kong to Singapore in the morning, and from San Francisco at night.
- Microsoft SQ1, a system on a chip
- sq1, a common abbreviation for the Square-1 (puzzle)

== See also ==
- SQL, special-purpose programming language designed for managing data
- Square One (disambiguation)
