= Pyraminx Crystal =

Dodecahedral combination puzzle

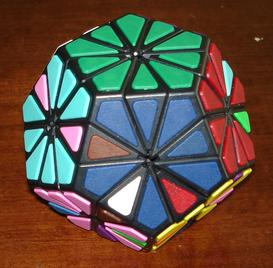
Pyraminx Crystal, partially solved

The Pyraminx Crystal is a dodecahedral puzzle similar to the Rubik's Cube and the Megaminx. It is manufactured by Uwe Mèffert and has been sold in his puzzle shop since 2008.

The puzzle was originally called the Brilic, and was first made in 2006 by Aleh Hladzilin, a member of the Twisty Puzzles Forum.

It is not to be confused with the Pyraminx, which is also invented and sold by Meffert.

== History ==
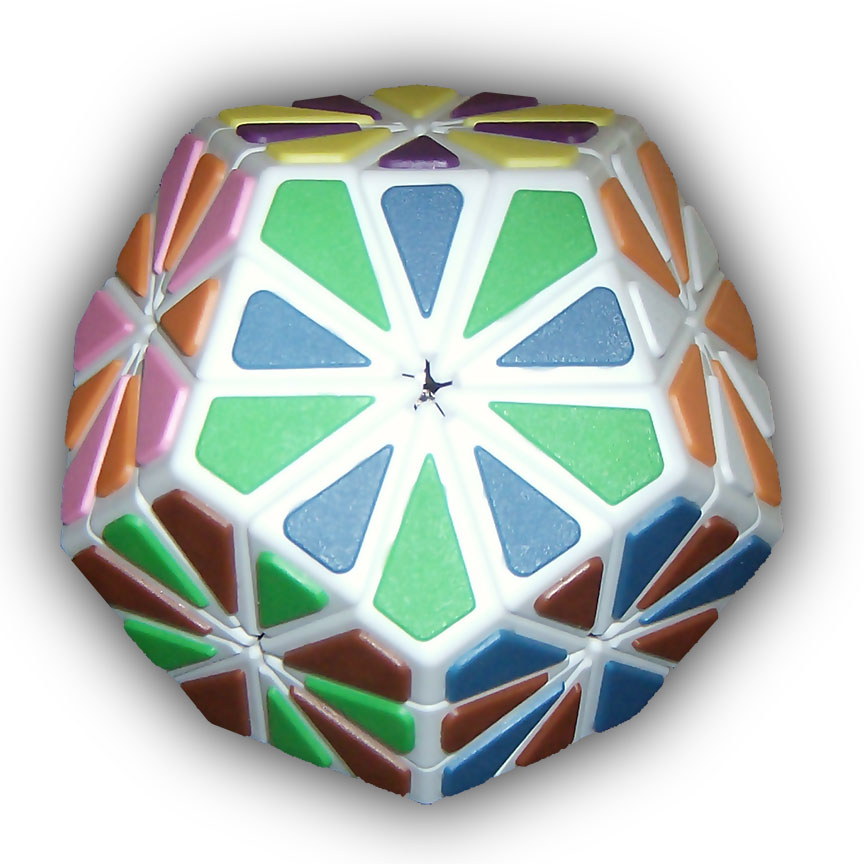
White-bodied Pyraminx Crystal with a star pattern applied to the faces.

The Pyraminx Crystal was patented in Europe on July 16, 1987. The patent number is DE8707783U.

In late 2007, due to requests by puzzle fans worldwide, Uwe Mèffert began manufacturing the puzzle. The puzzles were first shipped in February 2008. There are two 12-color versions, one with the black body commonly used for the Rubik's Cube and its variations, and one with a white body.

The puzzle company QJ started manufacturing this puzzle in 2010, leading Meffert's Puzzles to file a lawsuit against QJ.

The Pyraminx Crystal ran out of stock fairly quickly, and became a collector's puzzle. In October 2011, a new set was created with some slight improvements to the quality.

== Description ==
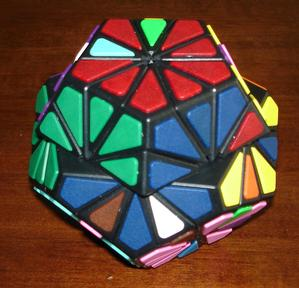
Pyraminx Crystal, one face in the middle of a twist

The puzzle consists of a dodecahedron sliced in such a way that each slice cuts through the centers of five different pentagonal faces. This cuts the puzzle into 20 corner pieces and 30 edge pieces, with 50 pieces in total.

Each face consists of five corners and five edges. When a face is turned, these pieces and five additional edges move with it. Each corner is shared by 3 faces, and each edge is shared by 2 faces. By alternately rotating adjacent faces, the pieces may be permuted.

The goal of the puzzle is to scramble the colors, and then return it to its original state.

== Solutions ==
The puzzle is essentially a deeper-cut version of the Megaminx, and the same algorithms used for solving the Megaminx's corners may be used to solve the corners on the Pyraminx Crystal. The edge pieces can then be permuted by a simple 4-twist algorithm, R L' R' L, that leaves the corners untouched, in a manner similar to the Pyraminx. This can be applied repeatedly until the edges are solved.

== Records ==
The World Cube Association (WCA) does not keep records for the Pyraminx Crystal. Simon Westlund claims to have the unofficial record with a time of 2:05.40.

== Number of combinations ==
There are 30 edge pieces with 2 orientations each, and 20 corner pieces with 3 orientations each, giving a maximum of 30!·2^{30}·20!·3^{20} possible combinations. However, this limit is not reached because:

1. Only even permutations of edges are possible, reducing the possible edge arrangements to 30!/2.
2. The orientation of the last edge is determined by the orientation of the other edges, reducing the number of edge orientations to 2^{29}.
3. Only even permutations of corners are possible, reducing the possible corner arrangements to 20!/2.
4. The orientation of the last corner is determined by the orientation of the other corners, reducing the number of corner combinations to 3^{19}.
5. The orientation of the puzzle does not matter (since there are no fixed face centers to serve as reference points), dividing the final total by 60. There are 60 possible positions and orientations of the first corner, but all of them are equivalent because of the lack of face centers.

This gives a total of $\frac{30!\times 2^{27}\times 20!\times 3^{19}}{60} \approx 1.68\times 10^{66}$ possible combinations.

The full figure is 1 677 826 942 558 722 452 041 933 871 894 091 752 811 468 606 850 329 477 120 000 000 000 (roughly 1.68 unvigintillion on the short scale or 1.68 undecillion on the long scale).

== See also ==
- Rubik's Cube
- Megaminx
- Dogic
- Pyraminx
- Combination puzzle
- Mechanical puzzle
