= Combination puzzle =

Puzzles solved by mechanical manipulation

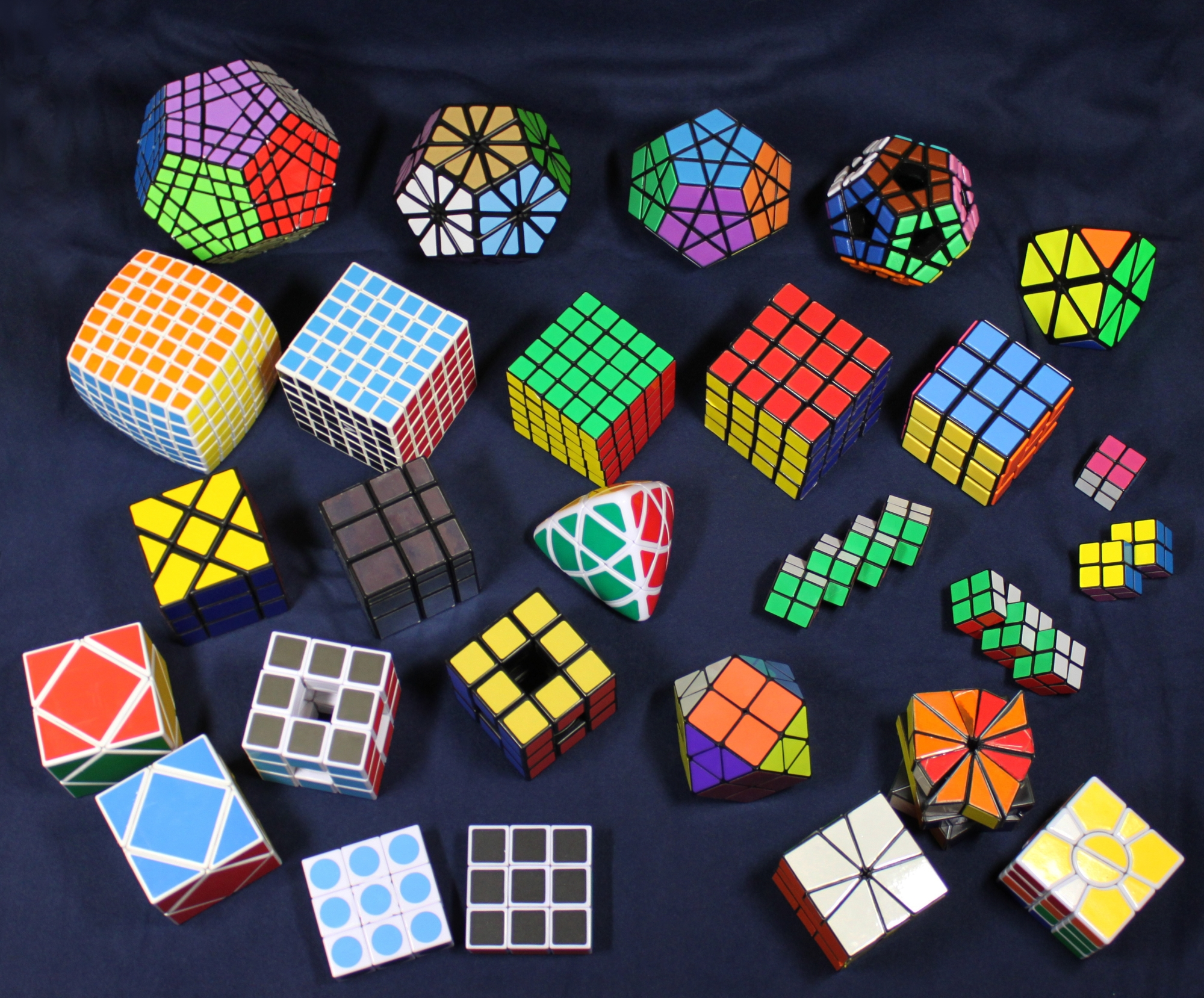
A combination puzzle collection

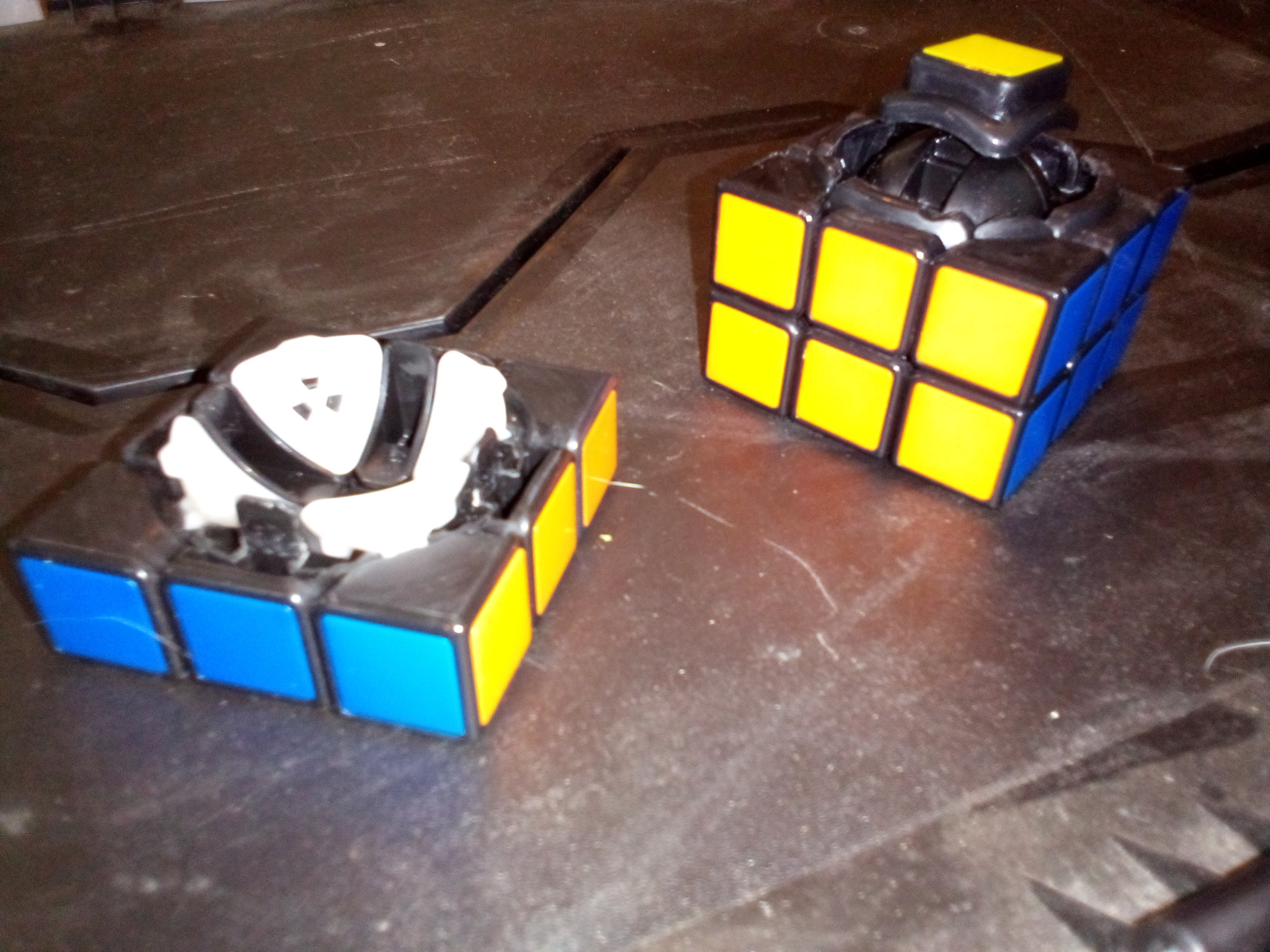
A disassembled modern Rubik's 3x3

A combination puzzle, also known as a sequential move puzzle, is a puzzle which consists of a set of pieces which can be manipulated into different combinations by a group of operations. Many such puzzles are mechanical puzzles of polyhedral shape, consisting of multiple layers of pieces along each axis which can rotate independently of each other. Collectively known as twisty puzzles, the archetype of this kind of puzzle is the Rubik's Cube. Each rotating side is usually marked with different colours, intended to be scrambled, then solved by a sequence of moves that sort the facets by colour. Generally, combination puzzles also include mathematically defined examples that have not been, or are impossible to, physically construct.

== Description ==
A combination puzzle is solved by achieving a particular combination starting from a random (scrambled) combination. Often, the solution is required to be some recognisable pattern such as "all like colours together" or "all numbers in order". The most famous of these puzzles is the original Rubik's Cube, a cubic puzzle in which each of the six faces can be independently rotated. Each of the six faces is a different colour, but each of the nine pieces on a face is identical in colour in the solved condition. In the unsolved condition, colours are distributed amongst the pieces of the cube. Puzzles like the Rubik's Cube which are manipulated by rotating a section of pieces are popularly called twisty puzzles. They are often face-turning, but commonly exist in corner-turning and edge-turning varieties.

The mechanical construction of the puzzle will usually define the rules by which the combination of pieces can be altered. This leads to some limitations on what combinations are possible. For instance, in the case of the Rubik's Cube, there are a large number of combinations that can be achieved by randomly placing the coloured stickers on the cube, but not all of these can be achieved by manipulating the cube rotations. Similarly, not all the combinations that are mechanically possible from a disassembled cube are possible by manipulation of the puzzle. Since neither unpeeling the stickers nor disassembling the cube is an allowed operation, the possible operations of rotating various faces limit what can be achieved.

Although a mechanical realization of the puzzle is usual, it is not actually necessary. It is only necessary that the rules for the operations are defined. The puzzle can be realized entirely in virtual space or as a set of mathematical statements. In fact, there are some puzzles that can only be truly realized in virtual space. An example is the 4-dimensional 3×3×3×3 tesseract puzzle, simulated by the MagicCube4D software. However one of the developers of the software -Melinda Green- created a 3D analogue of a 2x2x2x2 and can be ordered here: superliminal.com/physical2x2x2x2. 4D puzzles NOT for sale (made by Grant) include: 2x2x2x3, 2x2x3x3, 2x3x3x3, 3x3x3x3, 1x3x3x3 and many more.

== Types ==
There have been many different shapes of Rubik type puzzles constructed. As well as cubes, all of the regular polyhedra and many of the semi-regular and stellated polyhedra have been made.

=== Regular cuboids ===
A cuboid is a rectilinear polyhedron. That is, all its edges form right angles. Or in other words (in the majority of cases), a box shape. A regular cuboid, in the context of this article, is a cuboid puzzle where all the pieces are the same size in edge length. Pieces are often referred to as "cubies".

Picture	Data	Geometric shape	Piece configuration	WCA event	Comments
2×2×2 Cube Puzzle	Commercial name: Pocket Cube Main article: Pocket Cube	Cube	2×2×2	check	Simpler to solve than the standard cube in that only the algorithms for the corner pieces are required. It is nevertheless surprisingly non-trivial to solve.
3×3×3 Cube Puzzle	Commercial name: Rubik's Cube Main article: Rubik's Cube	Cube	3×3×3	(5 events)	The original Rubik's Cube
4×4×4 Cube Puzzle	Commercial name: Rubik's Revenge Main article: Rubik's Revenge	Cube	4×4×4	(2 events)	Solution is much the same as 3×3×3 cube except additional (and relatively simple) algorithm(s) are required to unscramble the centre pieces and edges and additional parity not seen on the 3x3x3 Rubik's Cube.
5×5×5 Cube Puzzle	Commercial name: Professor's Cube Main article: Professor's Cube	Cube	5×5×5	(2 events)	Solution is much the same as 3×3×3 cube except additional (and relatively simple) algorithm(s) are required to unscramble the centre pieces and edges.
6×6×6 Cube Puzzle	Commercial names: 6×6×6 Rubik's Cube, 7×7×7 Rubik's Cube, 8×8×8 Rubik's Cube Main articles: V-Cube 6, V-Cube 7, and V-Cube 8	Cube	6×6×6 to 8×8×8	6×6×6 and 7×7×7 8×8×8 and higher	Panagiotis Verdes holds a patent to a method which is said to be able to make cubes up to 11×11×11. He has fully working products for 2×2×2 - 9×9×9 cubes.
3×3×3×3 Hypercube Puzzle	4-Dimensional puzzle Main article: N-dimensional sequential move puzzles	Tesseract	3×3×3×3	X mark	This is the 4-dimensional analog of a cube and thus cannot actually be constructed. However, it can be drawn or represented by a computer. Significantly more difficult to solve than the standard cube, although the techniques follow much the same principles. There are many other sizes of virtual cuboid puzzles ranging from the trivial 3×3 to the 5-dimensional 7×7×7×7×7 which has only been solved twice so far. However, the 6×6×6×6×6 has only been solved once, since its parity does not remain constant (due to not having proper center pieces)
Four different cuboid-shaped combination puzzles	Non-uniform cuboids	Cuboid	A: 2×2×4; B: 3×3×2; C: 2×2×3; D: 3×3×4	(they are sometimes hosted as an unofficial event in some WCA competitions)	Most of the puzzles in this class of puzzle are generally custom made in small numbers. Most of them start with the internal mechanism of a standard puzzle. Additional cubie pieces are then added, either modified from standard puzzles or made from scratch. The four shown here are only a sample from a very large number of examples. Those with two or three different numbers of even or odd rows also have the ability to change their shape. The 2×2×4 is sold by Rubik's as the Rubik's Tower and is able to be configured into irregular shapes. The 2×2×3 (also known as the Tower Cube) was manufactured by Chronos and distributed by Japanese company Gentosha Education; it is the third "Okamoto Cube" (invented by Katsuhiko Okamoto). It does not change form, and the top and bottom colours do not mix with the colours on the sides.
	Siamese cubes	Fused cubes	two 3×3×3 fused 1×1×3		Siamese cubes are two or more puzzles that are fused so that some pieces are common to both cubes. The picture here shows two 3×3×3 cubes that have been fused. The largest example known to exist is in The Puzzle Museum and consists of three 5×5×5 cubes that are siamese fused 2×2×5 in two places. there is also a "2 3x3x3 fused 2x2x2" version called the fused cube. The first Siamese cube was made by Tony Fisher in 1981. This has been credited as the first example of a "handmade modified rotational puzzle" It Was Once A Wca Event from 2003 to 2007 Before Being dropped to Lack of popualrity.
Void cube	Commercial name: Void cube	Menger Sponge with 1 iteration	3x3x3-7.	X mark	Solutions to this cube is similar to a regular 3x3x3 except that odd-parity combinations are possible with this puzzle. This cube uses a special mechanism due to absence of a central core.
Crazy cube type I Crazy cube type II	Commercial name: Crazy cube type I Crazy cube type II	Cube	4x4x4.	X mark	The inner circles of a Crazy cube 4x4x4 move with the second layer of each face. On a crazy cube type I, they are internally connected in such a way that they essentially move as 8 distinct pieces, not 24. To solve such a cube, think of it as a 2x2x2 (pocket cube) trapped inside a 4x4x4 (Rubik's Revenge). Solve the 2x2x2 first, then solve the 4x4x4 by making exchanges only. Solving the type II is much more difficult.
	Commercial name: Over The Top	Cube	17x17x17	X mark	Experimental cube made by 3D printing of plastic invented by Oskar van Deventer. Corners are much larger in proportion, and edge pieces match that larger dimension; they are narrow, and do not resemble cubes. The rest of the cubelets are 15x15 arrays on each side of the whole cube; as planned, they would be only 4 mm on a side. The original mechanism is a 3x3x3 core, with thin "vanes" for the center edges; the rest of the cubelets fill in the gaps. The core has a sphere at its center. As of 2023, it is being mass produced by the Chinese companies YuXin and ShengShou.

==== Pattern variations ====
There are many puzzles which are mechanically identical to the regular cuboids listed above but have variations in the pattern and colour of design. Some of these are custom made in very small numbers, sometimes for promotional events. The ones listed in the table below are included because the pattern in some way affects the difficulty of the solution or is notable in some other way.

Picture	Data	Comments
3×3×3 calendar cube	Commercial name: Calendar Cube; Geometric shape: Cube; Piece configuration: 3×3×3	Mechanically identical to the standard 3×3×3 cube, but with specially printed stickers for displaying the date. Much easier to solve since five of the six faces are ignored. Ideal produced a commercial version during the initial cube craze. Sticker sets are also available for converting a normal cube into a calendar.
3×3×3 Cube puzzle with numbers	Commercial Name: Magic Cube; Geometric shape: Cube; Piece configuration: 3×3×3	Mechanically identical to the standard 3×3×3 cube. However, the numbers on the centre pieces force the solver to become aware that each one can be in one of four orientations, thus hugely increasing the total number of combinations. The number of combinations of centre face orientations is 4^{6}. However, odd combinations (overall odd number of rotations) of the centre faces cannot be achieved with legal operations. The increase is therefore x2^{11} over the original making the total approximately 10^{24} combinations. This adds to the difficulty of the puzzle but not astronomically; only one or two additional algorithms are required to affect a solution. Note that the puzzle can be treated as a number magic square puzzle on each of the six faces with the magic constant being 15 in this case.

===== Sudoku Cube =====
The Sudoku Cube or Sudokube is a variation on a Rubik's Cube in which the aim is to solve one or more sudoku puzzles on the sides or rows. The toy was originally created in 2006 by Jay Horowitz in Sebring, Ohio. It was subsequently produced in China, marketed and sold internationally.

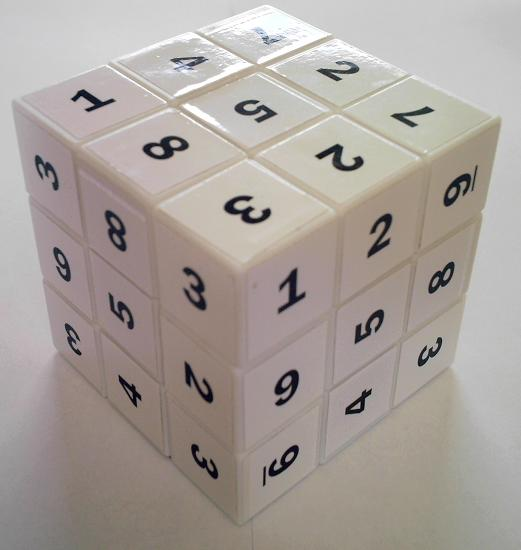
A scrambled colorless Sudoku Cube

====== Production ======
The Sudoku Cube was invented by veteran toy maker Jay Horowitz, a puzzle inventor who primarily reproduced older toys for the collectibles market. Horowitz first encountered a sudoku puzzle when a woman sitting next to him on a plane ride explained it to him. After being introduced to the puzzle, Horowitz wanted to introduce the puzzle to the games business, and had the idea of combining it with the Rubik's cube. Horowitz already had access to moulds for the Rubik's Cube, as he owned the Ideal Toy Company which owned moulds. Horowitz worked for a month until he figured out how to combine the two puzzles together, and then when he figured it out, he "did not sleep for three days" while he worked out how to best arrange the numbers to create 18 unique sudoku puzzles within the cube. Horowitz then patented the numerical design that he created. Mass production was completed in China by American Classic Toy Inc, a company belonging to Horowitz. The product was sold in the United States in retailers such as Barnes & Noble and FAO Schwarz and sold for $9.87 each. The price was chosen specifically because each number only appears once.

====== Marketing ======
Horowitz promoted his new product at toy fairs such as the 2007 American International Toy Fair and Hong Kong Toys and Games Fair. Adrienne Citrin, the spokeswoman for the Toy Industry Association, mentioned that sudoku fans who felt like they had mastered the original paper version of the puzzle were interested in the new product. The product was originally launched in the US and then sold internationally, exporting to Spain, France, South Africa and the United Kingdom. Shortly after release, there were several imitator products sold on Amazon under the name "Sudokube".

=== Irregular cuboids ===
An irregular cuboid, in the context of this article, is a cuboid puzzle where not all the pieces are the same size in edge length. This category of puzzle is often made by taking a larger regular cuboid puzzle and fusing together some of the pieces to make larger pieces. In the formulae for piece configuration, the configuration of the fused pieces is given in brackets. Thus, (as a simple regular cuboid example) a 2(2,2)x2(2,2)x2(2,2) is a 2×2×2 puzzle, but it was made by fusing a 4×4×4 puzzle. Puzzles which are constructed in this way are often called "bandaged" cubes. However, there are many irregular cuboids that have not (and often could not) be made by bandaging.

Picture	Data	WCA event	Comments
Skewb Puzzle	Commercial name: Skewb; Geometric shape: Cube; Piece configuration: 3x3x3 Main article: Skewb	check	Similar to the original Rubik's Cube, the Skewb differs in that its four axes of rotation pass through the corners of the cube rather than the centres of the faces. As a result, it is a deep-cut puzzle in which each twist scrambles all six faces.
	Bandaged Cubes; Geometric shape: Cube; Piece configuration: various	X mark	This is a simple example of one a large number of bandaged cube types that have been made. A bandaged cube is a cube where some of the pieces are stuck together.
Square One Puzzle	Commercial name: Square One; Geometric shape: Cube Main article: Square One (puzzle)	check	A variation on the original Rubik's Cube where it can be turned in such a manner as to distort the cubical shape of the puzzle. The Square One consists of three layers. The upper and lower layers contain kite and triangular pieces. The middle layer contains two trapezoid pieces, which together may form an irregular hexagon or a square. Square One is an example of another very large class of puzzle — cuboid puzzles which have cubies that are not themselves all cuboid.
Golden Cube	Commercial name: Tony Fisher's Golden Cube; Geometric shape: Cube	X mark	First rotational puzzle created that has just one colour, requiring the solver to restore the puzzle to its original cube form without colour aids.
	Commercial name: Lan Lan Rex Cube (Flower Box); Geometric shape: Cube	X mark	
	Commercial name: Mixup Cube; Geometric shape: Cube	X mark	Invented by Oskar van Deventer, it looks like a disproportional Rubik's Cube, but it allows the middle layer to turn 45 degrees and swap center pieces with edge pieces.
	Commercial name: Ivy Cube Geometric shape: Cube	(has been mentioned as an unofficial event in some WCA competitions)	A puzzle which has 3 sides on each face, it has 4 axis of rotation and 4 'floating' corners. It has a center piece resembling a leaf on each side

=== Other polyhedra ===
Picture	Data	Geometric shape	Piece configuration	WCA event	Comments
3×3×3 tetrahedron puzzle	Commercial Name: Pyraminx Main article: Pyraminx	Tetrahedron	3×3×3	check	Tetrahedral-shaped puzzle with axes on the corners and trivial tips. It was invented in 1970 by Uwe Mèffert.
2×2×2 tetrahedron puzzle	Commercial Name: Pyramorphix Main article: Pyramorphix	Tetrahedron	2×2×2	X mark	Edge turning tetrahedron shaped puzzle with a 2×2×2 cube mechanism.
Brain Twist Stellated position	Commercial Name: BrainTwist Main article: BrainTwist	Tetrahedron	2x2x2	X mark	The BrainTwist is a unique tetrahedral puzzle with an ability to "flip", showing only half of the puzzle at a time.
Skewb Diamond puzzle	Commercial Name: Skewb Diamond Main article: Skewb Diamond	Octahedron	3x3x3	(has been mentioned as an unofficial event in some WCA competitions)	An octahedral variation on the Skewb, it is a deep-cut puzzle very similar to the Skewb and is a dual-polyhedron transformation.
A face-turning-octahedron with its faces turned	Commercial Name: Face Turning Octahedron Main article: Face Turning Octahedron	Octahedron	3x3x3	(will become a WCA event in the beginning of 2027)	Each of the puzzle's faces can rotate independently from one another. Functionally, its mechanism is similar to the Skewb Diamond. The puzzle is commonly abbreviated as "FTO."
3×3×3 dodecahedron puzzle	Commercial Name: Megaminx Main article: Megaminx	Dodecahedron	3×3×3	check	12-sided polyhedron puzzle similar to Rubik's Cube in operation and solution.
Gigaminx	Commercial Name: Gigaminx, Teraminx, Petaminx	Dodecahedron	gigaminx: 5x5x5; teraminx: 7x7x7; petaminx: 9x9x9	(the Gigaminx has been mentioned as an unofficial event in some WCA competitions)	Megaminx variants with multiple layers per face. The Gigaminx has 2 layers per face, for a total of 5 layers per edge; the Teraminx has 3 layers per face, 7 layers per edge; and the Petaminx has 4 layers per face, 9 layers per edge.
Skewb Ultimate	Commercial Name: Skewb Ultimate Main article: Skewb Ultimate	Dodecahedron	3x3x3	X mark	While appearing more difficult than the Skewb Diamond, it is functionally very similar to the Skewb and Skewb Diamond. The puzzle is cut in a different manner but the same solutions can be used to solve it by identifying what pieces are equivalent. Because faces of the Skewb Diamond correspond to corners of the Skewb Ultimate, an additional constraint on the orientation of these pieces appears. Any Skewb Diamond solution thus requires a few additions in order to solve the Skewb Ultimate.
Deep-cut dodecahedral puzzle	Commercial Name: Pyraminx Crystal; Geometric shape: Piece configuration: Main article: Pyraminx Crystal	Dodecahedron	3x3x3	X mark	A dodecahedron cut into 20 corner pieces and 30 edge pieces. It is similar to the Megaminx, but is deeper cut, giving edges that behave differently from the Megaminx's edges when twisted.
Rounded icosahedron puzzle	Commercial Name: Alexander's Star Main article: Alexander's Star	Great dodecahedron	3x3x3	X mark	12-sided Nonconvex uniform polyhedron puzzle similar to Rubik's Cube in operation and solution.
3×3×3 Great Dodecahedron puzzle	Commercial Name: Impossiball Main article: Impossiball	icosahedron	2x2x2	X mark	Rounded icosahedron puzzle similar to Pocket Cube in operation and solution.
12 Coloured Dogic puzzle	Commercial Name: Dogic Main article: Dogic	Icosahedron	4x4x4	X mark	The Dogic is an icosahedron cut into 60 triangular pieces around its 12 tips and 20 face centers.
Solved 120 cell puzzle	Commercial Name: Magic 120-cell Main article: N-dimensional sequential move puzzles § Magic 120-cell	120-cell	3×3×3×3	X mark	Virtual 4-dimensional puzzle, the 4-D analogue of the Megaminx.

=== Non-Rubik style three-dimensional ===
Picture	Data	WCA event	Comments
Holey burr puzzle	Name: holey burr puzzles with level > 1 Piece configuration: 6 interlocking sticks Main article: Burr puzzle § Holey burr	X mark	A holey burr puzzle is characterised by internal holes, which usually allow for sliding movements of individual pieces or groups of pieces. The level of a holey burr puzzle specifies how many sliding movements are necessary to assemble or disassemble the puzzle.
Minus Cube	Commercial Name: Minus Cube; Piece configuration: 2×2×2-1 sliding cubes Main article: Minus Cube	X mark	The Minus Cube is a 3D mechanical variant of the n-puzzle. It consists of a bonded transparent plastic box containing seven small cubes. There is an empty space the size of one small cube inside the box and the small cubes are moveable inside the box by tilting the box causing a cube to fall into the space.
Rubik's Clock	Commercial Name: Rubik's Clock; Piece configuration: 3×3×2 12-position dials Main article: Rubik's Clock	(will be removed as a WCA event in July 18, 2027)	Rubik's Clock is a two-sided puzzle, each side presenting nine clocks to the puzzler. There are four wheels, one at each corner of the puzzle, each allowing the corresponding corner clock to be rotated directly. There are also four pins next to the center clock, which control the rotation of the four adjacent clock faces.
Rubik's Snake as a cat	Commercial Name: Rubik's Snake; Piece configuration: 1x1x24 Main article: Rubik's Snake	X mark	Some would not count this as a combinational puzzle though it bears the Rubik name. Also known as Rubik's Twist. There is no one solution to this puzzle but multiple different shapes can be made.
Rubik's Snske	Commercial Name: Snake Cube; Piece configuration: 1x1x27 or 1x1x64 Main article: Snake cube	X mark	The cubelets are connected by an elastic band running through them. They can rotate freely. The aim of the puzzle is to arrange the chain in such a way that they will form 3 x 3 x 3 or 4 x 4 x 4 cube.
The Orb-It puzzle	Commercial Name: Orb-It / Orb Piece configuration: 56 beads on a set of 4 rails.	X mark	The puzzle is split into two halves that rotate around a central point causing the four rails to intermingle allowing in the jumbling of pieces. The solution is to put each color on its own separate rail.

=== Two-dimensional ===
Picture	Data	Comments
7×7 sliding puzzle	Sliding piece puzzle Piece configuration: 7×7 Main article: Sliding puzzle	These ubiquitous puzzles come in many sizes and designs. The traditional design is with numbers and the solution forms a magic square. There have been many different designs, the example shown here uses graphic symbols instead of numbers. The solution requires that there are no repeated symbols in any row, column or diagonal. The picture shows the puzzle unsolved.
	Sliding piece puzzle with picture Piece configuration: 7×7 Main article: Sliding puzzle	Mechanically, no different from the puzzle above. However, the picture on the pieces gives it something of the nature of a jigsaw puzzle, in addition to being a combination puzzle. Note that the picture consists of a multitude of polyhedra which have been made into Rubik puzzles.
15 puzzle	Fifteen puzzle Piece configuration: 4×4-1 Main article: Fifteen puzzle	The original sliding piece puzzle. Plus, this has been mentioned as an unofficial event in some WCA competitions, just like the UnOrono-thodox Blocks 2025.
Rubik's Magic	Rubik's Magic Main article: Rubik's Magic	Not entirely 2D. Involves flipping parts back onto itself. This used to be an official WCA event before, but was now removed in 2014 due to lack of randomization and difficult judging.
Master Magic	Rubik's Master Magic Main article: Rubik's Magic: Master Edition	The five ringed version of the Rubik's Magic. Same reason for its removal for the Rubik's Magic.
3×3 virtual puzzle	Commercial name:2D Magic Cube; Geometric shape:Square; Piece configuration: 3×3 Main article: N-dimensional sequential move puzzles § 3x3 2D square	Another virtual puzzle in the Rubik series, but this time a very simple one.
Klotski	Klotski; Piece configuration: 4×5-2 with some fused pieces Main article: Klotski	A traditional sliding piece puzzle. There are now endless variations of this original puzzle implemented as computer games.
	Geranium; Piece configuration: 5 intersecting circular rotational groups of oddly shaped pieces	A rotating piece puzzle. Some rank its difficulty very high compared to complex 3D puzzles. There are other versions of this puzzle type including "Mini", "Pocket" and "Super", which have 2, 3 and 10 intersecting circles. There is an "Upgrade" mod which splits some of the large pieces into smaller ones. This puzzle's current production status is unknown.

=== Geared puzzles ===
Picture	Data	Comments
3x3 Gear cube, solved	Gear Cube	This twisty puzzle was invented by Oskar van Deventer. Edge pieces are gears that turn when faces turn and force opposite faces to turn together. Despite its appearance it is considered easier than the Rubik's Cube. This was mentioned as an unofficial WCA event.

== See also ==
- N-dimensional sequential move puzzles
- Puck puzzle
