= Back to square one =

"Back to square one" is a phrase that means "to go back to the beginning, after a dead-end or failure".

It may also refer to:

- Square One (puzzle), also called "Back to Square One"
- Back to Square One (film), a 1994 German film
- Back to Square One (mixtape), a 2023 mixtape by Digga D

== See also ==
- Square One (disambiguation)
