= Square One =

Square One may refer to:

== Film and TV ==
- Square One: Michael Jackson, a 2019 investigative documentary about the first allegations of child sexual abuse brought by the Chandler family
- Square One Television, a children's television series about math
- Square One (game show), a British game show
- Square One (film), a 1997 Australian film

== Music ==
- Square One (band), a 1980s Barbados-based soca band
- Square One (M-Flo album), a 2012 album by Japanese artist M-Flo
- Square One (single album), 2016 single album of South Korean girl group Blackpink
- "Square One" (song), a 2006 song by Tom Petty
- Square 1, a 2003 album by Irish singer-songwriter David Kitt
- "Square One", a 2005 song by Coldplay from their album, X&Y

== Other uses ==
- Square-1 (puzzle), a variant of the Rubik's Cube
- Square One Bus Terminal, an intercity bus terminal in Mississauga, Ontario, Canada
- Square One Mall, a shopping mall in Saugus, Massachusetts, United States
- Square One Organic Vodka, an artisanal organic spirit
- Square One Publishers, a book publishing company
- Square One Shopping Centre, a shopping mall in Mississauga, Ontario, Canada
- Square One Studios, a US mobile game developer which operated from 2010-2011
- Square One, play by Nigel Williams
- Square One, working title for Here We Are, the last musical written by Stephen Sondheim, inspired by The Discreet Charm of the Bourgeoisie

== See also ==
- Back to square one (disambiguation)
