= Tony Fisher (puzzle designer) =

British puzzle designer

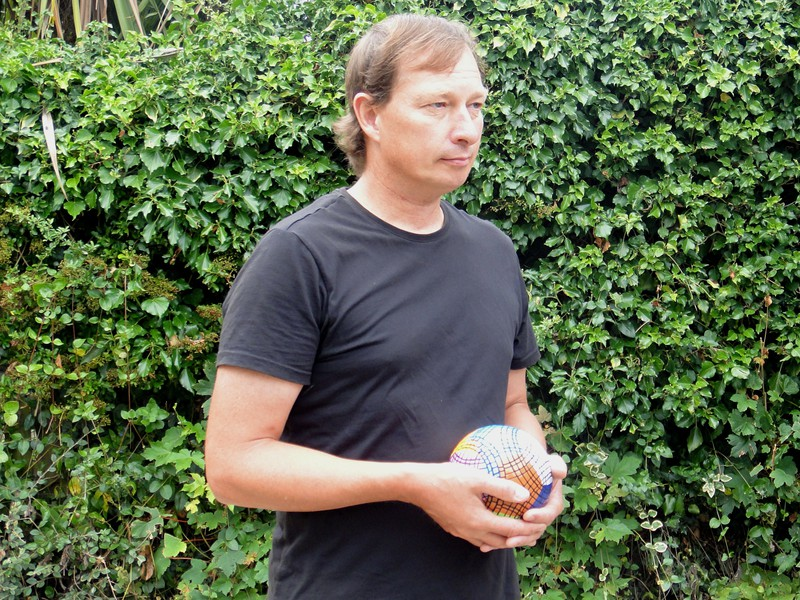
Tony Fisher at a puzzle event with one of his puzzles

Tony Fisher is a British puzzle designer who specialises in creating custom rotational puzzles. He is acknowledged by cubing enthusiasts as a pioneer in the creation of new puzzle designs and new manufacturing techniques. In 2017 the Guinness Book of World Records acknowledged Fisher as the creator of the world's largest Rubik's cube.

== Career ==
Fisher is both a puzzle collector and designer. He first bought a Rubik's Cube in 1980 when it was first released in the UK. He worked out his own solution to solve it. Fisher first began creating puzzles in 1981, when he modified two existing Rubik’s cubes by joining them along one edge to create a new device called the Siamese cube. This has been accredited as the first example of a “handmade modified rotational puzzle”.

In 1995 Fisher further modified the conventional rotational puzzle design by shifting its cutting planes to create a 3x3x4 cube. 3 years later the similar technique was used to build the world's first fully functional 3x4x4 cuboid which required more complex structure of edge and corner pieces. This invention was further adapted in the creation of 2x2x3, 2x3x4, 3x3x5, 4x4x5 and 5x5x6 puzzles. Another technique, initially developed by Geert Hellings, rounded the centre piece of a conventional 4x4x4 cube to create additional turning layers for a uniform 2x2x4, 6x6x6 and non-uniform 2x2x6. Tony Fisher adapted this idea to create a giant 2x2x6 which had proportional(square) cubies. In 2008, when the V-Cube 6 had come into production, Tony Fisher started thinking about building fully functional 5x5x6 or 5x6x6 cuboids. In June 2009 he finished making the world's first fully functional 5x5x6 cuboid which was made by modifying the internal V-cube 6 by partially rounding some of the layers and covering this moving core with 15mm cubies. The 5x6x6 idea was abandoned since, as Tony Fisher saw from the 5x5x6, the corner stalks of the 5x5x6 cuboid were already fractional in thickness. Fisher’s Golden Cubes, initially intended to be released as the Millennium Cube, began production in the early 2000s. Created by modifying the Skewb, it is the first example of a rotational puzzle that features just one colour scheme, requiring the solver to restore the cube’s shape without the visual aid of having separate colours for each side. The Golden Cube is considered to be Fisher’s most unusual contribution to the design of new combination puzzles, and has been mass-produced by Uwe Meffert.

The overlapping cube and ball in a cube puzzles were followed by using the modified mechanism from an Eastsheen 4x4x4 cube, and in 2007 the Hexaminx puzzle, a cubic version of the Megaminx for which Fisher has used new manufacturing techniques involving polyurethane resins to make the tiny extensions as one solid piece.

Since 1981 Fisher has designed and crafted around 100 puzzles based on different puzzle mechanisms. As well as puzzle manufacturing, he has also worked for Suffolk County Council as an archaeologist. In 2021 Tony Fisher made some twisty puzzle chess sets. Each chess figure was acting like a 2x2x2 with some bandaging. In 2022 he presented the “Floppy floppy cube”, made from a “very weird material”.

=== Guinness World Record ===
At the beginning of 2016 he built the world's largest Rubik's Cube, which took him a total 156 hours to build in his garage. It was 1.57 metres tall and weighed 100 kilograms. He released a sped-up video showing how he spent two days working to solve the massive puzzle.

In 2017 the Guinness Book of World Records acknowledged Fisher as the creator of the world's largest Rubik's cube, which measured 1.57m long, created in 2016.

=== Other novelty cubes ===
In June 2016 Fisher also created the world's smallest functioning Rubik's Cube which measured only 5.6 millimetres on each side.

In December 2017 he unveiled a Rubik’s Cube which was made from 95% ice. His other creations include a Rubik's Cube made from candles; one made from cheese; and one made from chocolate.

=== Fidget spinner ===
In June 2017 he unveiled the world largest(at that moment) fidget spinner. The spinner had a diameter of over 3.3 metres, and took him 40 hours to build.

== Puzzle designs ==
Examples of Fisher’s puzzle designs can be found at the Puzzle Museum, including his Cylinder Cube, Golden Cube, Hexagonal Prism, Truncated Octaminx and Truncated Octahedron.
