= Megaminx =

Puzzle

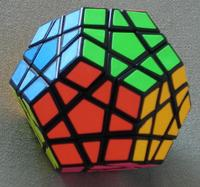
A 6-color Megaminx, solved

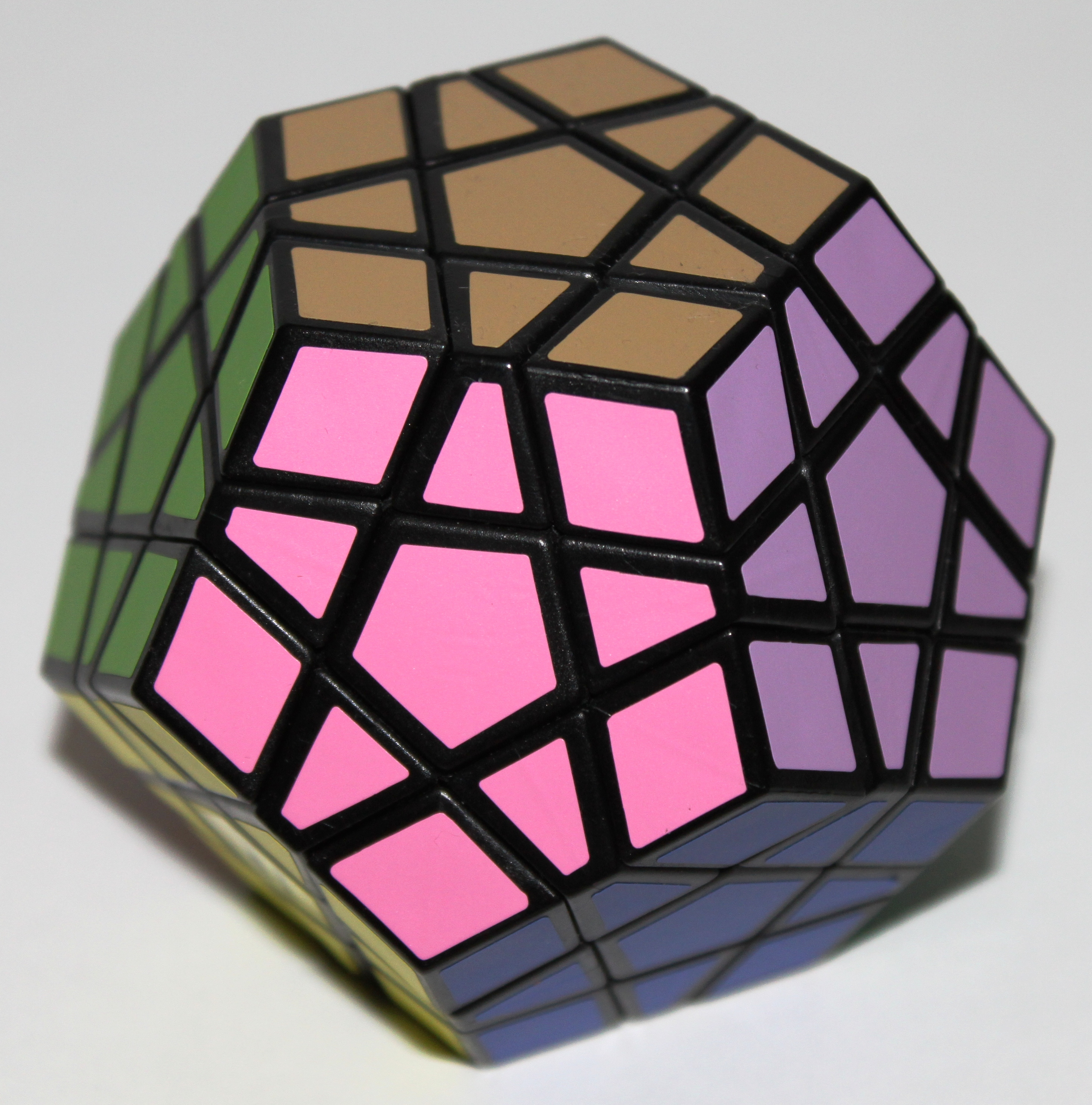
A 12-color Megaminx, solved

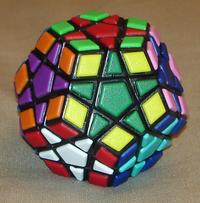
A 12-color Megaminx in a star-pattern arrangement

The Megaminx or Mégaminx (/ˈmɛɡəmɪŋks/, /ˈmeɪ-/) is a dodecahedron-shaped puzzle similar to the Rubik's Cube. It has a total of 50 movable pieces to rearrange, compared to the 20 movable pieces of the Rubik's Cube.

== History ==
The Megaminx, or Magic Dodecahedron, was invented by several people independently and produced by several different manufacturers with slightly different designs. Uwe Mèffert eventually bought the rights to some of the patents and continues to sell it in his puzzle shop under the Megaminx moniker. It is also known by the name Hungarian Supernova, invented by Dr. Christoph Bandelow. His version came out first, shortly followed by Mèffert's Megaminx. The proportions of the two puzzles are slightly different. The Supernova is cut in such a way that the cuts on each face meet at the edges, forming a pentagram. Mèffert's Megaminx has somewhat wider edges relative to the corners.

Speed-solving the Megaminx became an official World Cube Association event in 2003, with the first official single-solve record set by American Grant Tregay with a time of 2 minutes 12.82 seconds during the World Rubik's Games Championship in Canada. The first sub-minute solve in official competition was achieved by Japanese solver Takumi Yoshida with a time of 59.33s at the January 2009 Amagasaki Open, and the first sub-30-second single solve was achieved by Peruvian solver Juan Pablo Huanqui at a 2017 Santiago competition with a time of 29.93 seconds. The current world record time for a Megaminx solve is 21.04 seconds, set by Chinese speedsolver Ziyu Wu on May 30th 2026.

== Description ==
The Megaminx is made in the shape of a dodecahedron, and has 12 faces and center pieces, 20 corner pieces, and 30 edge pieces. The face centers each have a single color, which identifies the color of that face in the solved state. The edge pieces have two colors, and the corner pieces have three. Each face contains a center piece, 5 corner pieces and 5 edge pieces. The corner and edge pieces are shared with adjacent faces. The face centers can only rotate in place, but the other pieces can be permuted by twisting the face layer around the face center.

There are two main versions of the Megaminx. The 6-color variant has opposite faces the same color. The more commonly known 12-color variant uses a unique color for each face of the puzzle. The most common 12-color scheme starts with white bordered by yellow, dark blue, red, dark green, and purple. Directly opposite each of these faces, respectively, are gray/black, beige, light blue, orange, light green and pink. Black is a common alternate face color, either replacing gray which improves color contrast on what is typically the last layer solved, or replacing beige, which typically shares two neighbors (red and green) with the white face which can make piece identification challenging in certain lighting conditions. The 12-color Megaminx is the only type legal in official WCA competitions (color scheme variations are legal as long as each face is uniquely colored), and is therefore much more popular than the 6-color version.

The objective of the puzzle, similar to that of a Rubik's Cube or related puzzles, is to scramble the colors, and then restore it to its original state of having one color per face by turning each face in sequence to reorient/reposition the edge and corner pieces adjacent to that face's center piece.

== Solutions ==
Regardless of color variant, the most common solution strategy shares qualities with common methods for solving a Rubik's Cube. The solution begins with one face, where the solver will reconstruct the "star" formed by the edge pieces adjacent to that face, each one properly paired with the neighboring center color (analogous to the "white cross" of the beginner and CFOP methods for a Rubik's Cube). Once this is done, the five white corner pieces are placed, commonly paired with the appropriate edge piece on the opposing side of each corner from the starting face. The star, first five corners and first five edges are known as the "first two layers", similar to those of a 3×3 cube. From here, the solver will typically proceed to the "second two layers", which involves a similar process of joining and positioning corner and edge pieces around the equator of the puzzle, and then the corners and edges in the hemisphere opposite the starting face. This is all typically done "intuitively", turning faces of the puzzle based on where the solver wishes the pieces to move, with the result of each move being predictable given some experience manipulating the puzzle.

This leaves the solver with the last face, most commonly grey (opposite the white starting face), which will require a series of more complicated move sequences to orient (flip/rotate) and permute (rearrange) the pieces of the last layer in predefined ways without disturbing the solved lower layers. These "algorithms" are similar to those used on a Rubik's Cube and thus familiar to those experienced in solving one. These differences require minor changes in notation of the algorithms compared to those commonly used for a cube-shaped puzzle. The most commonly used beginner method of solving the Megaminx requires only four or five algorithms of between three and six moves each to be memorized, which will be used to orient and then permute the last layer's edge pieces to form the last layer star, followed by orienting and permuting last layer corners. More complicated algorithm sets require memorization of a wider variety of distinct sequences of longer length.

The 6-color Megaminx comes with an additional challenge which does not occur on the 12-color puzzle. Its edge pieces come in visually identical pairs, because of the duplicated colors of opposite faces. However, although visually indistinguishable, they are nevertheless mathematically bound in a parity relationship. In any legal position (reachable from the solved state without disassembling the puzzle), there is always an even number of swapped pairs of edges. However, since swaps may be between visually identical edges, one may find that having solved almost the entire puzzle, one is left with a pair of swapped (distinct) edges that seems to defy all attempts to exchange them. The solution is to swap a single pair of 'identical' edges to resolve the parity issue, and then restore the rest of the puzzle. The corners are all visually distinct, as the two corners with the same three colors are mirror images of each other.

This property is absent in the 12-color Megaminx, because all its edges are distinguishable. "Impossible" permutations of a 12-color Megaminx, causing behaviors inconsistent with the expectations of a solving method, are the result of manipulations not possible solely by turning the faces during a scramble or solve. The most common is a "corner twist", an often-necessary side effect of puzzles designed to allow some misalignment of a face when beginning rotation of an adjacent face (so-called "corner-cutting"). The looser tolerances allow a corner to be rotated in place, independent of any other face or corner, placing the puzzle in a permutation that face turns alone cannot solve. Most other "impossible" permutations of the puzzle are the result of improper assembly, and are avoided by always reassembling the puzzle into a solved state after disassembly for cleaning, maintenance or adjustment.

== Variations ==
The Megaminx puzzle itself is produced in several variations by many different manufacturers, most of which also produce other types of WCA and similar rotating puzzles. Among the most common areas of variation in construction are puzzle/piece size and weight, specific shades of the face colors, the presence and prominence of tactile aids such as ridges or dimples to aid grip and rotation, the ability and method of adjusting the puzzle's tolerance and tension between pieces, and the presence and strength of magnets within the pieces, the latter of which aids in keeping the various faces of the puzzle aligned to reduce lock-ups due to multiple faces being partially rotated.

Color variations of the Megaminx are common, to the extent that WCA rules for scrambling the Megaminx detail how to proceed if the default starting orientation (white on top, green in front) is not possible due to color replacement or rearrangement. A popular modification on 12-color Megaminxes is to change the color of the face opposite the white face from its default grey to black. This is a trivial modification for traditional "stickered" puzzles with a black base color for pieces (simply remove the stickers and, if each face must have stickers for competition use, replace them with a set of black stickers cut to fit); for "stickerless" puzzles using multiple colored plastics, most manufacturers produce a set of the required pieces in black plastic, and the puzzle can be partially disassembled to replace the pieces of any face. This color change increases the contrast between this face, which usually forms the last unsolved layer, and the colors of adjacent faces, which aids in pattern recognition and thus the correct selection of algorithms to solve the last layer. Other color modifications are less common, but as long as each face has a visually unique uniform color, the puzzle is legal, so solvers are free to rearrange puzzle colors at their discretion.

There are many similar 12-sided puzzles with different numbers of layers, many of which change the "mega" in the puzzle's name to another metric prefix. They are the Monominx (1 layer, trivial) Kilominx (2 layers), Master Kilominx (4 layers), Gigaminx (5 layers), Elite Kilominx (6 layers), Teraminx (7 layers), Royal Kilominx (8 layers), Petaminx (9 layers), Examinx (11 layers), Zettaminx (13 layers), Yottaminx (15 layers), Ronnaminx (17 layers), and Atlasminx or Quettaminx (19 layers). The highest order variant of the Megaminx ever made to date is the Minx of Madness, created by Coren Broughton using FDM printing. The Minx of Madness was revealed in May 2022. It is the dodecahedral equivalent to a 21×21×21 Rubik's cube.

Alexander's Star is equivalent to solving only the edges of a six-color Megaminx.

The Impossiball and Kilominx are equivalent to solving only the corners of a Megaminx, but are very different mechanically. The Impossiball is available with either six or twelve colors.

The Pyraminx Crystal is a modified Megaminx with deeper turning planes.

Tony Fisher has produced a shape modification of the Megaminx into a cube form which he called the Hexaminx. Another variant is the Holey Megaminx, which has no center pieces, like the Void Cube. It is being produced by Mèffert as of July 2009. Other variants include the Flowerminx, Megaminx Ball, and Crazy Megaminx.

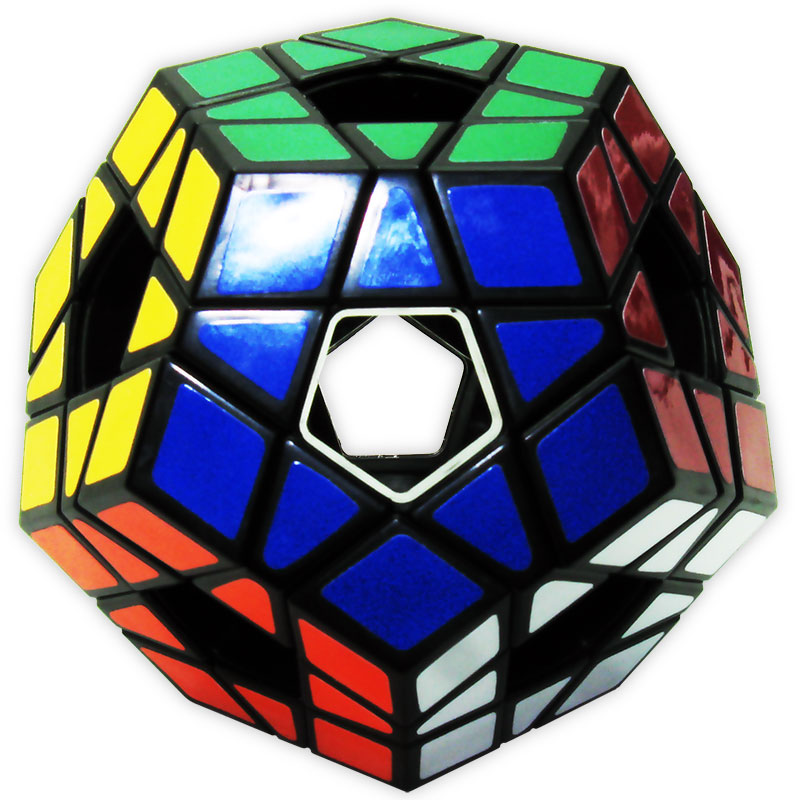
A Holey Megaminx, with black body

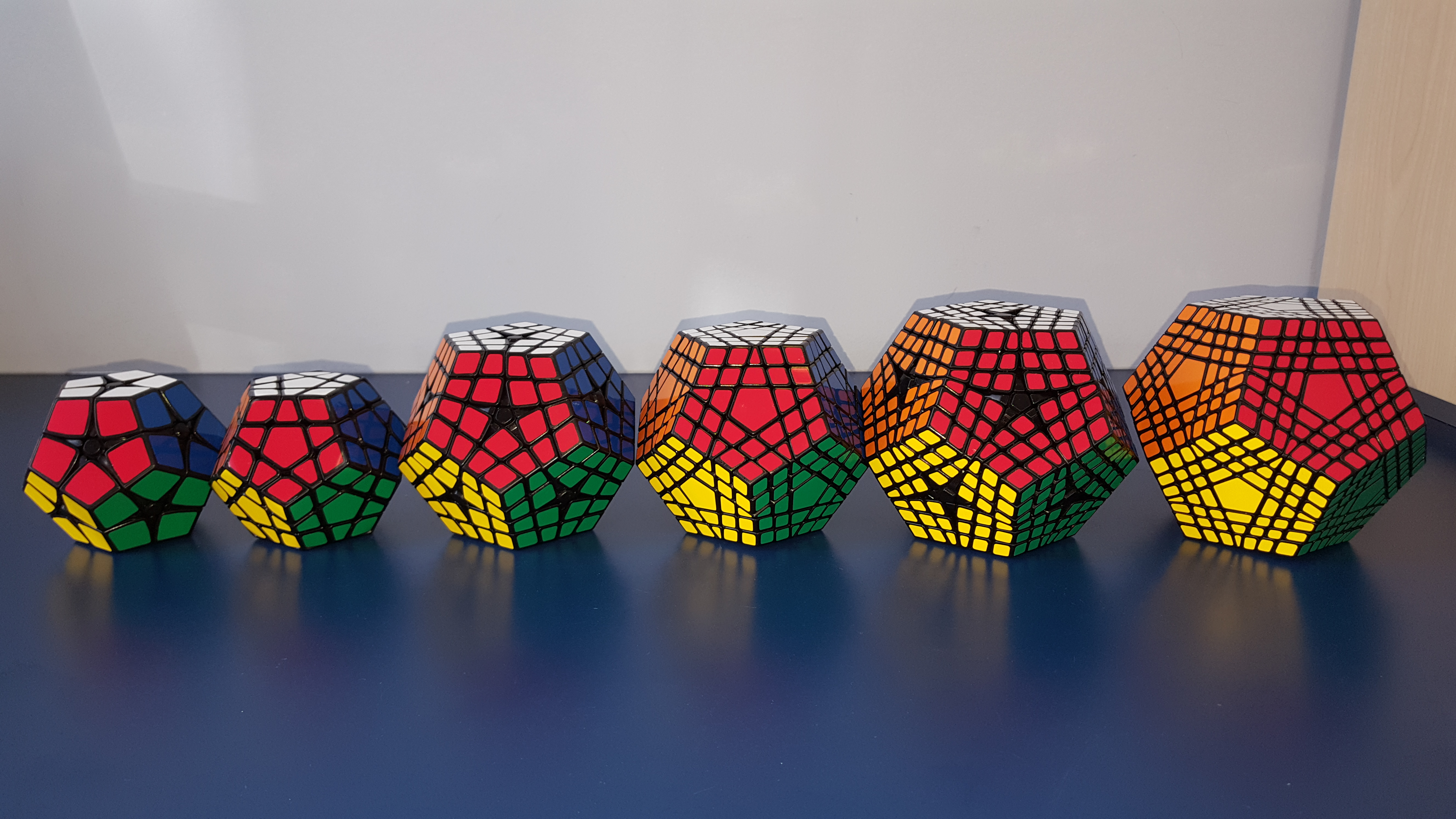
Kilominx, Megaminx, Master Kilominx, Gigaminx, Elite Kilominx, Teraminx

== Number of combinations ==
Ernesto González solving a Megaminx at TLP Tenerife 2017

The Megaminx has 20 corners and 30 edges. It is possible on a Rubik's Cube to have a single pair of corners and a single pair of edges swapped, with the rest of the puzzle being solved. In this example, the corner and edge permutations are each odd, but their sum is even. This parity situation is impossible on the Megaminx. For both types of pieces (corner and edge), only even permutations are possible, regardless of the position of the other set of pieces. There are 20!/2 ways to arrange the corners and 3^{19} ways to orient them, since the orientation of the last corner depends on that of the preceding ones. There are 30!/2 ways to arrange the edges and 2^{29} ways to flip them.

$20! \times 3^{19} \times 30! \times 2^{27} \approx 1.01 \times 10^{68}$ The full number is 100 669 616 553 523 347 122 516 032 313 645 505 168 688 116 411 019 768 627 200 000 000 000 (roughly 101 unvigintillion on the short scale or 101 undecillion on the long scale).

The corners are distinguishable on a 6-color Megaminx because two corners with the same three colors will be mirror images of each other. There are 15 pairs of identical edges. It would not be possible to swap all 15 pairs, since this would be an odd permutation of the edges, so a reducing factor of 2^{14} is applied to the preceding figure.

$$20! \times 3^{19} \times 30! \times 2^{13} \approx 6.14 \times 10^{63}$$

The full number is 6 144 385 775 971 883 979 645 753 925 393 402 415 081 061 792 664 780 800 000 000 000 (roughly 6.1 vigintillion on the short scale or 6.1 decilliard on the long scale).

For the larger size variations of the Megaminx (gigaminx, teraminx, petaminx, examinx, zettaminx, and yottaminx), the general number of combinations is $\frac{30! \times 20! \times 60!^{n^2-1} \times 2^{28-n} \times 3^{19}}{5!^{12n(n-1)}}$ where $n = 1,2,3,4,...$ respectively. The number of combinations evaluates to $3.65\times 10^{263}$ for gigaminx, $1.15\times 10^{573}$ for teraminx, $3.16\times 10^{996}$ for petaminx, $7.58\times 10^{1533}$ for examinx, $1.58\times 10^{2185}$ for zettaminx, and $2.87\times 10^{2950}$ for yottaminx.

== Records ==
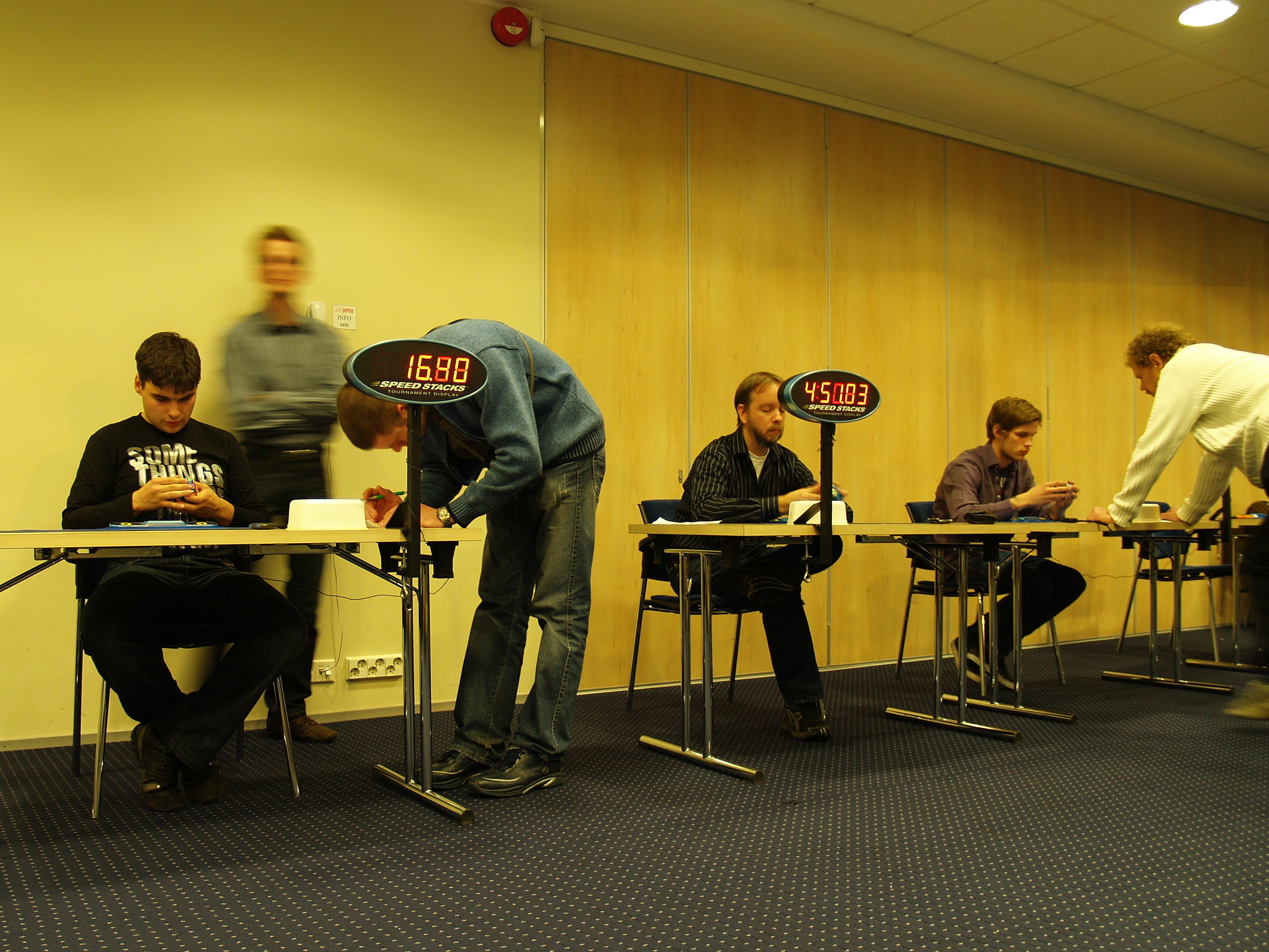
Speedsolvers solving Megaminxes at the Estonian Open 2011

The world record single solve is 21.04 seconds, set by Ziyu Wu (吴子钰) of China on 30 May 2026 at Quanzhou Summer 2026 in Quanzhou, China.

The world record average of five solves (excluding fastest and slowest times) is 23.40 seconds, set by Timofei Tarasenko of Russia on 22-23 August 2026 at Kuala Lumpur Cubing Challenge 2026 in Sri Petaling, Malaysia, with times of (22.47), (24.29), 23.57, 23.73, and 22.91 seconds.

=== Top 10 solvers by single solve ===
Rank	Name	Result	Competition
1	(China) Ziyu Wu (吴子钰)	21.04s	(China) Quanzhou Summer 2026
2	(Russia) Timofei Tarasenko	21.85s	(China) Start of Summer Beijing 2026
3	(New Zealand) Alexander Vujcich	22.32s	(New Zealand) NZ North Island Championship 2026
4	(United Kingdom) Aidan Grainger	22.89s	(United Kingdom) Weston-super-Mare Spring 2025
5	(Argentina) Leandro Martín López	22.98s	(Argentina) Entre Ríos Cubea 2025
6	(Republic of Ireland) Stephanie Rose Martin	23.13s	(Republic of Ireland) Meath For Mega Speed 2026
7	(Singapore) Tristan Chua Yong	23.77s	Singapore Big Cube 2024
8	(United States) Alexei Sinyavin	24.57s	(United States) Rockland Rounds 2026
9	(Spain) Pablo Amoraga Velasco	25.20s	(Netherlands) Rubik's WCA European Championship 2026
10	(Peru) Juan Pablo Huanqui	25.24s	(Peru) Lima Cuberano 2022

=== Top 10 solvers by Olympic average of 5 solves ===
Rank	Name	Result	Competition	Times
1	(Russia) Timofei Tarasenko	23.40s	(Malaysia) Kuala Lumpur Cubing Challenge 2026	(22.47), (24.29), 23.57, 23.73, 22.91
2	(China) Ziyu Wu (吴子钰)	24.61s	(China) Quanzhou Summer 2026	(28.81), 24.38, (21.55), 23.08, 26.38
3	(Argentina) Leandro Martín López	25.40s	(Argentina) Entre Ríos Cubea 2025	25.53, (29.79), 26.93, 23.74, (22.98)
4	(Republic of Ireland) Stephanie Rose Martin	25.71s	(Republic of Ireland) Rubik's Irish Championship 2026	26.64, (27.74), (23.76), 25.40, 25.09
5	(New Zealand) Alexander Vujcich	26.60s	(United States) A New Year in Auckland 2026	(28.03), 27.82, 26.60, 25.38, (24.15)
5	(United Kingdom) Aidan Grainger	26.60s	(United Kingdom) Crewe Spring 2026	27.16, 24.93, 27.70, (30.91), (24.32)
7	(Singapore) Tristan Chua Yong	26.92s	Singapore Masters 2023	28.20, 25.69, 26.87, (25.21), (DNF)
8	(Indonesia) Matthew Liong	27.25s	(United States) Rockland Rounds 2026	27.61, (28.68), (26.22), 26.57, 27.57
9	(United States) Alexei Sinyavin	27.92s	(United States) Apple Cider Open MA 2024	27.73, (30.00), (26.93), 27.03, 29.01
10	(Poland) Maksymilian Kulas	28.40s	(Hungary) Hungarian Open 2026	27.85, 28.59, 28.76, (31.10) (25.25)

== See also ==
- Impossiball
- Alexander's Star
- Pyraminx Crystal
- Pocket Cube
- Rubik's Cube
- Rubik's Revenge
- Professor's Cube
- V-Cube 6
- V-Cube 7
- V-Cube 8
- Pyraminx
- Skewb Diamond
- Tuttminx
- Dogic
- Combination puzzles
- Magic 120-cell
