= Puck puzzle =

Combination puzzle by András Végh

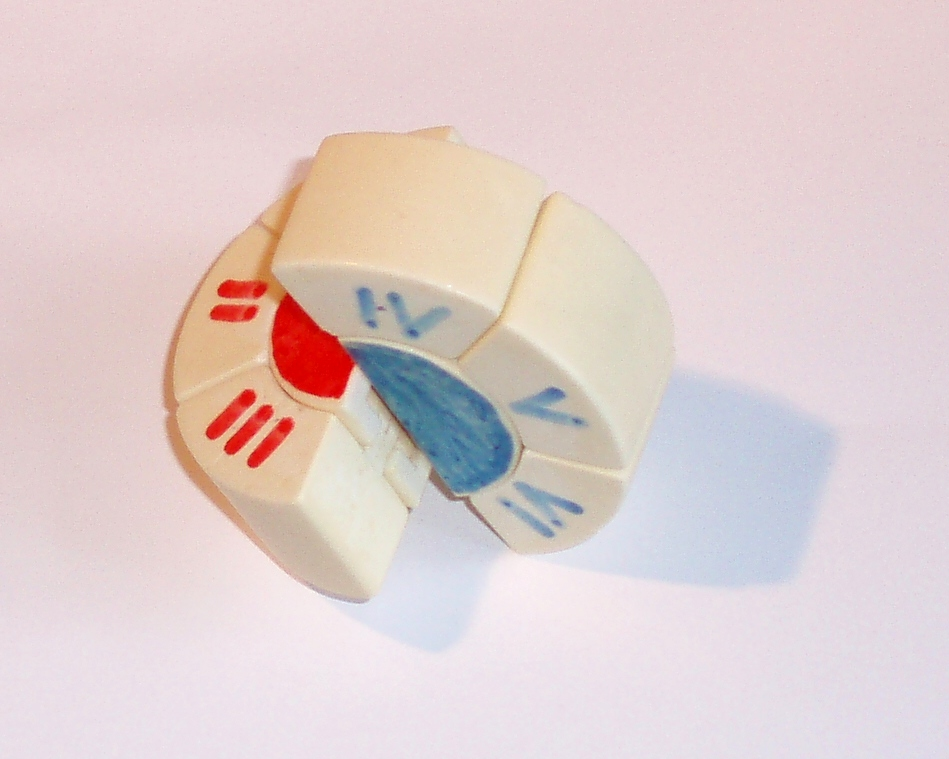
- The Puck
- Type: Combination puzzle
- Invented by: András Végh
- Availability: 1980–present

The Puck puzzle (Hungarian: Kép Korong), also known as Picture Disc, is a combination puzzle invented in 1980 by Hungarian physicist András Végh. The disc shaped puzzle consists of 2 central pieces: the inner disc, and segments forming a ring around the inner disc. The number of segments is an even number, most commonly six, eight, or twelve. The outer ring can be rotated around the central disc, similar to a wheel being rotated around its axis. The two parts of the central disc can also be rotated, together with the attached ring. With these operations, the combination of the parts can be changed. The goal of the game is to obtain a specific combination, such as forming a picture or ordering a sequence of numbers on the segments.
