= Square-1 (puzzle) =

Shape-shifting puzzle similar to Rubik's Cube

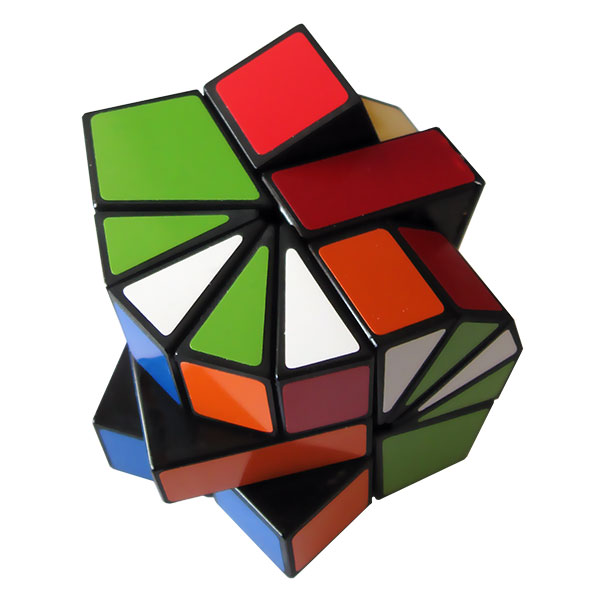
The Square-1 puzzle was sold in this shape with instructions for turning it back to a cube. This is halfway through a vertical turn.

The Square-1, also known as the Square One, is a variant of the Rubik's Cube. Its distinguishing feature among the numerous Rubik's Cube variants is that it can change shape as it is twisted, due to the way it is cut, thus adding an extra level of challenge and difficulty. The Super Square One, Square Zero, and Square Two puzzles have also been introduced. The Super Square One has two additional layers that can be scrambled and solved independently of the rest of the puzzle, the Square Zero merged each of the corners with one edge each, making it simpler, and the Square Two has extra cuts made to the top and bottom layer, making the edge and corner wedges the same size.

== History ==
The Square-1 (full name "Back to Square One"), or alternatively, "Cube 21", was invented by Karel Hršel and Vojtěch Kopský in 1990. Application for a Czechoslovak patent was filed on 8 November 1990, then filed as a "priority document" on January 1, 1991. The patent was finally approved on 26 October 1992, with patent number CS277266. On March 16, 1993, the object itself was patented in the US with patent number US5,193,809 then its design was also patented, on October 5, 1993, with patent number D340,093.

=== Description ===
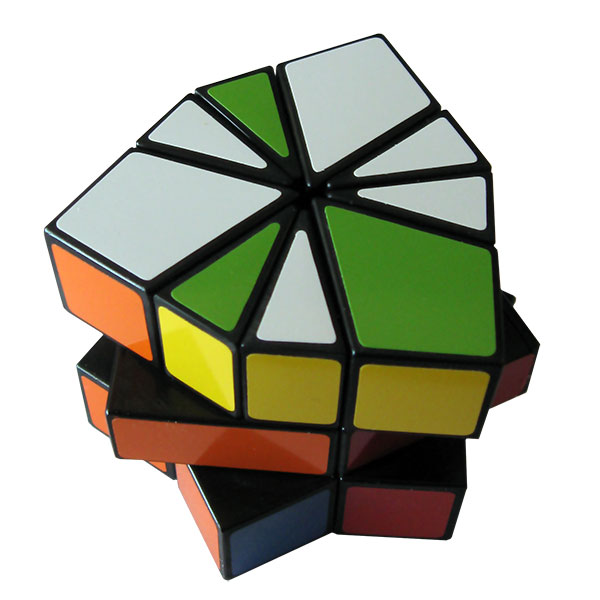
The Square-1 puzzle scrambled

The Square-1 consists of three layers. The upper and lower layers contain kite-shaped and triangular pieces. They are also called corner and edge pieces, respectively. There are altogether 8 kite and 8 triangular pieces. The kite pieces are 60 degrees wide, while the triangular pieces are 30 degrees wide, relative to the center of the layer.

The middle layer contains two trapezoid pieces, which together may form an irregular hexagon or a square.

Each layer can be rotated freely, and if the boundaries of pieces in all layers line up, the puzzle can be twisted vertically, interchanging half of the top layer with half of the bottom. In this way, the pieces of the puzzle can be scrambled. Note that because the kite pieces are precisely twice the angular width of the triangular pieces, the two can be freely intermixed, with two triangular pieces taking the place of a single kite piece and vice versa. This leads to bizarre shape changes within the puzzle at any point.

For the puzzle to be in cube shape, the upper and lower layers must have alternating kite and triangular pieces, with 4 kite and 4 triangular pieces on each layer, and the middle layer must have a square shape. However, since only two shapes are possible for the middle layer, there is a quick sequence of twists that changes the shape of the middle layer from one to the other without touching the rest of the puzzle.

Once the puzzle has a cube shape, the upper and lower layers are cut in an Iron Cross–like fashion, or equivalently cut by two concentric (standard) crosses, that make an angle with each other.

Like the Rubik's Cube, the pieces are coloured. For the puzzle to be solved, not only does it need to be in the shape of a cube, but also, each face of the cube must also have a uniform color. In its solved—or original—state, viewing the cube with the yellow face as the front face, the colors are: white on top, green on the bottom, yellow in front, red on the left, orange on the right, and blue behind. However, many mass-produced puzzles use the standard Rubik's Cube colour scheme, where if the red, blue, and orange faces have the same positions, the green, yellow, and white faces are on the front, bottom, and top respectively. Alternative versions of the Square-1 may have different color schemes, as well as different types of materials.

=== Solutions ===
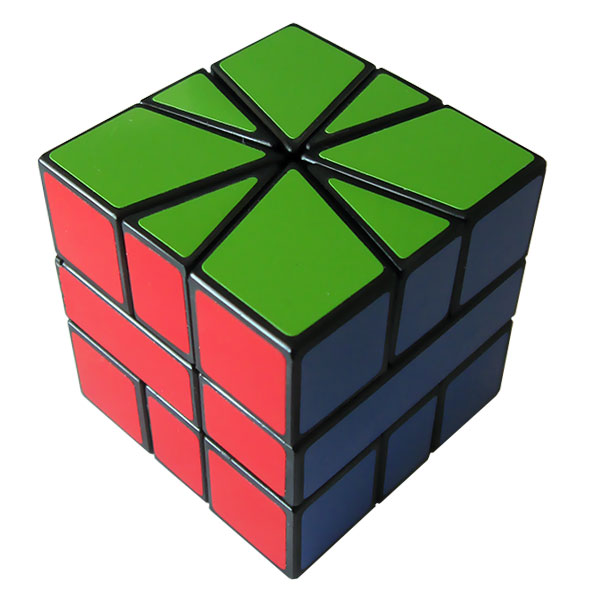
The same puzzle in its solved state

A good number of solutions for this puzzle exist on the Internet. Some solutions employ the classical layer-by-layer method, while other approaches include putting the corner pieces in place first, then the edge pieces, or vice versa. Some solutions are a combination of these approaches. Although these solutions use different approaches, most of them try to restore the cube shape of the puzzle first, regardless of the placement of the pieces and the parity of the middle layer, and then proceed to put the pieces in their correct places while preserving the cube shape. The shape is often restored first because it allows for the greatest range of possible moves at any one time—other shapes have fewer moves available.

The majority of solutions provide a large set of algorithms. These are sequences of turns and twists that will rearrange a small number of pieces while leaving the rest of the puzzle untouched. Examples include swapping two pieces, cycling through three pieces, etc. Larger scale algorithms are also possible, such as interchanging the top and bottom layers. Through the systematic use of these algorithms, the puzzle is gradually solved.

Like solutions of the Rubik's Cube, the solutions of Square-1 depend on the use of algorithms discovered either by trial and error or by using computer searches. However, while solutions of the Rubik's Cube rely on these algorithms more towards the end, they are heavily used throughout the course of solving the Square-1. This is because the uniform shape of the pieces in the Rubik's Cube allows one to focus on positioning a small subset of pieces while disregarding the rest, at least at the beginning of a solution. However, with the Square-1, the free intermixing of corner and edge pieces can sometimes cause a certain desired operation to be physically blocked—so, one must take all pieces into account right from the beginning. Some solutions of the Square-1 rely solely on the use of algorithms.

=== Number of positions ===
If different rotations of a given permutation are counted only once while reflections are counted individually, there are 170 × 2 × 8! × 8! = 552,738,816,000 positions.

If both rotations and reflections are counted only once, the number of positions reduces to 15! ÷ 3 = 435,891,456,000. Also, it always can be solved in a maximum of 13 twists.

If instead we wish to count only all those positions where there are no corner pieces in the way of twisting the halves, there are 3678 × 2 × 8! × 8! = 11,958,666,854,400 twistable positions, and always can be solved in a maximum of 31 face turns.

== Notation ==
=== Original notation ===
The original Square-1 notation was created by Jaap Scherphuis:

(x,y)/(x,y)

A slash (/) indicates turning the entire right half of the puzzle by 180°. The first number (x) refers to a number of 30° upper layer clockwise turns. The second number (y) refers to a number of 30° lower layer clockwise turns. Negative numbers mean turning counterclockwise. For example, the move (−4,5) would refer to turning the top face 120° counterclockwise, while moving the bottom face 150° clockwise at the same time. These numbers are always between −5 and 6, and they must not both equal 0.

=== Karnaukh notation ===
Karnaukh notation, also known as Karnotation, was created by Daniel Karnaukh. It is based on the original notation, with brackets and slashes being removed, with the latter being replaced with spaces, and with letters being assigned to common move sets. This notation was proposed as an easier way to write, learn and share speedsolving algorithms. It was not intended to be used for scrambling the Square-1. The full notation is here, but this is an abridged version:

Abbreviation	U	U'	u	u'	D	D'	d	d'	E	E'	e	e'	M	M'	m	m'
Algorithm	(3,0)	(−3,0)	(2,−1)	(−2,1)	(0,3)	(0,−3)	(−1,2)	(1,−2)	(3,−3)	(−3,3)	(3,3)	(−3,−3)	(1,1)	(−1,−1)	(2,2)	(−2,−2)

== Records ==
The world record for a single solve is 2.85 seconds, set by Brian Johnson of the United States at Evanston Qualifier 2026.

The world record for an Olympic average of 5 solves (excluding fastest and slowest) is 4.63 seconds, set by Sameer Aggarwal of the United States at Cubing in Southern Oregon 2025, with times of (8.08), 6.20, (3.42), 3.81, and 3.88 seconds.

=== Top 10 solvers by single solve ===
Rank	Name	Result	Competition
1	(United States) Brian Johnson	2.85s	(United States) Evanston Qualifier 2026
2	(United States) Hassan Khanani	3.40s	(United States) Steel City Sprint PA 2026
3	(United States) Ryan Pilat	3.41s	(United States) Wichita Family ArtVenture 2024
4	(United States) Sameer Aggarwal	3.42s	(United States) Cubing in Southern Oregon 2025
5	(United States) Brendyn Dunagan	3.53s	(United States) La La Land 2024
6	(United States) Dylan Baumbach	3.57s	(United States) Don't DNF Denton 2024
7	(Italy) Alessandro Ricci	3.61s	(Italy) Ivrea: Back to Square One 2024
8	(United States) Max Siauw	3.69s	(United States) UW or U Don't 2023
9	(Denmark) Rasmus Stub Detlefsen	3.70s	(China) Jiajiang Open 2026
10	(Colombia) Hector David Martinez Argaez	3.80s	(Colombia) Bima al Cubo V Bogotá 2026

=== Top 10 solvers by Olympic average of 5 solves ===
Rank	Name	Result	Competition	Times
1	(United States) Sameer Aggarwal	4.63s	(United States) Cubing in Southern Oregon 2025	(8.08), 6.20, (3.42), 3.81, 3.88
2	(United States) Hassan Khanani	4.69s	(United States) Redhawk Slow Summer OH 2026	(6.05), 4.69, 4.98, 4.40, (4.32)
3	(United States) Dylan Baumbach	4.81s	(United States) Cube More in Ardmore 2024	(4.19) 4.40, 5.13, 4.89, (DNF)
4	(United States) Max Siauw	4.91s	(United States) Stumptown Speedcubing Summer 2023	5.32, 4.60, (6.26), 4.80, (4.58)
5	(United States) Brendyn Dunagan	5.00s	(United States) UCSB Favorites 2025	5.01, 5.15, 4.85, (6.41), (4.56)
6	(United States) Brian Johnson	5.25s	(United States) CubingUSA Great Lakes Championship 2026	4.75, (4.73), 5.06, 5.95, (9.85)
7	(Australia) David Epstein	5.28s	(Australia) Megaminx in Mordialloc 2025	4.90, (6.09), 5.82, (4.79), 5.13
8	(Italy) Alessandro Ricci	5.43s	(Italy) Lodi Speedcubing 2024	(4.75), 5.57, 4.85, 5.87, (7.50)
9	(Denmark) Rasmus Stub Detlefsen	5.46s	(Denmark) Risbjerg September 2025	(4.99), (5.82), 5.32, 5.27, 5.80
9	(Brazil) Vicenzo Guerino Cecchini	5.46s	(Brazil) Etec Cubatão 2023	4.82, 5.56, (7.48), 6.00, (4.49)
9	(Brazil) Vicenzo Guerino Cecchini	5.46s	(Argentina) Rubik's WCA South American Championship 2024	5.08, (5.00), 5.56, 5.74, (6.71)

== Super Square One ==
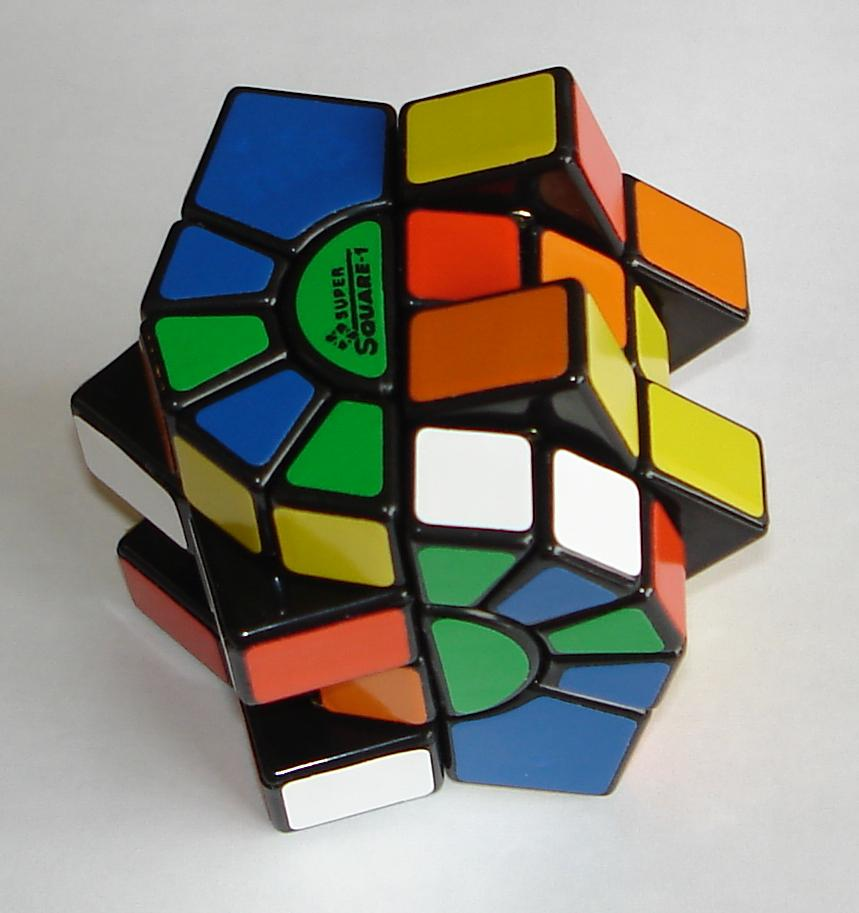
The Super Square One, scrambled

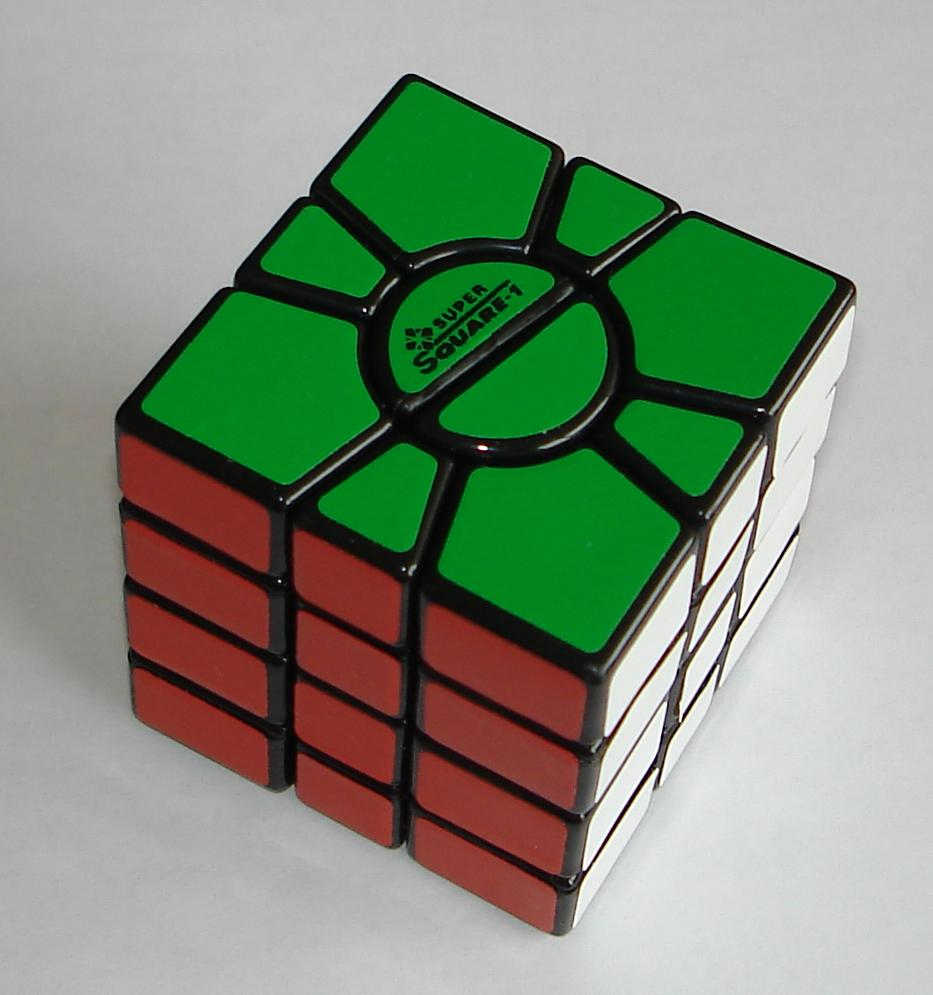
The Super Square One, solved

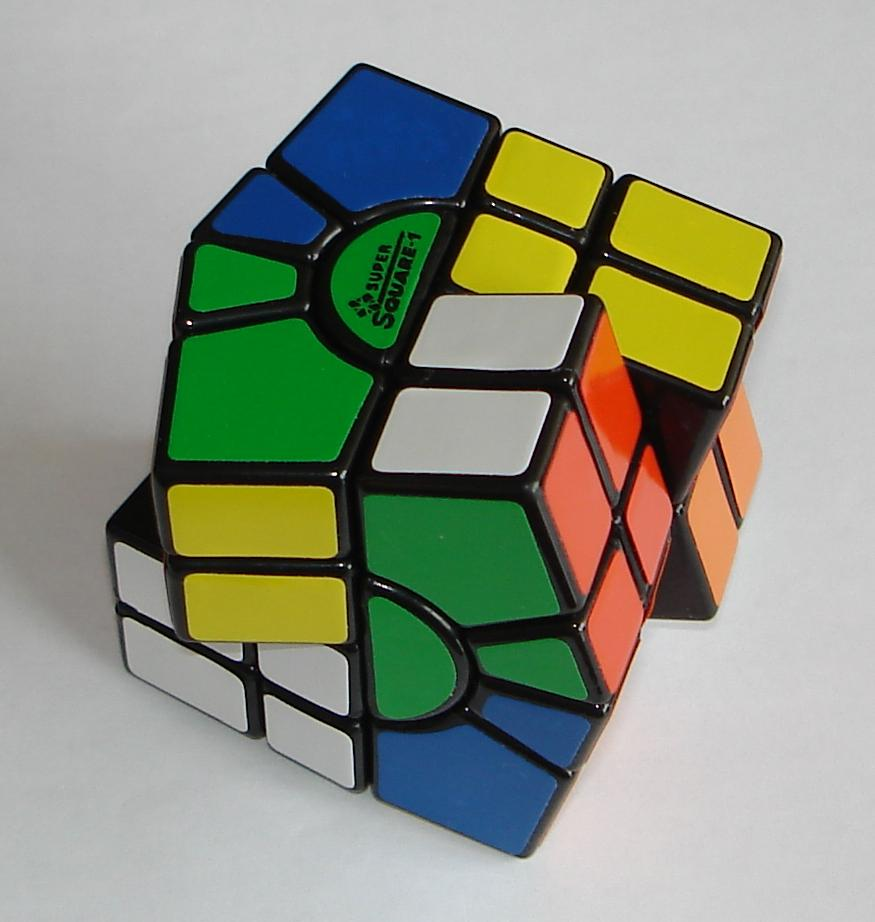
The Super Square One, mid-turn

The Super Square One is a 4-layer (along the height) version of the Square-1. Just like the Square-1, it can adopt non-cubic shapes as it is twisted. As of 2009, it is sold by Uwe Mèffert in his puzzle shop, Meffert's.

It consists of 4 layers of 8 pieces, each surrounding a circular column which can be rotated along a perpendicular axis. This allows the pieces from the top and bottom layers and the middle two layers to be interchanged. Each layer consists of 8 movable pieces: 4 wider wedges and 4 narrower wedges. In the top and bottom layers, the wider pieces are the "corner" pieces, and the narrower pieces are the "edge pieces". In the middle two layers, the wider pieces are the "edge" pieces, and the narrower pieces are the "face centers". The wider pieces are exactly twice the angular width of the narrower pieces, so that two narrower pieces can fit in the place of one wider piece. Thus, they can be freely intermixed. This leads to the puzzle adopting a large variety of non-cubic shapes.

== Square Two ==
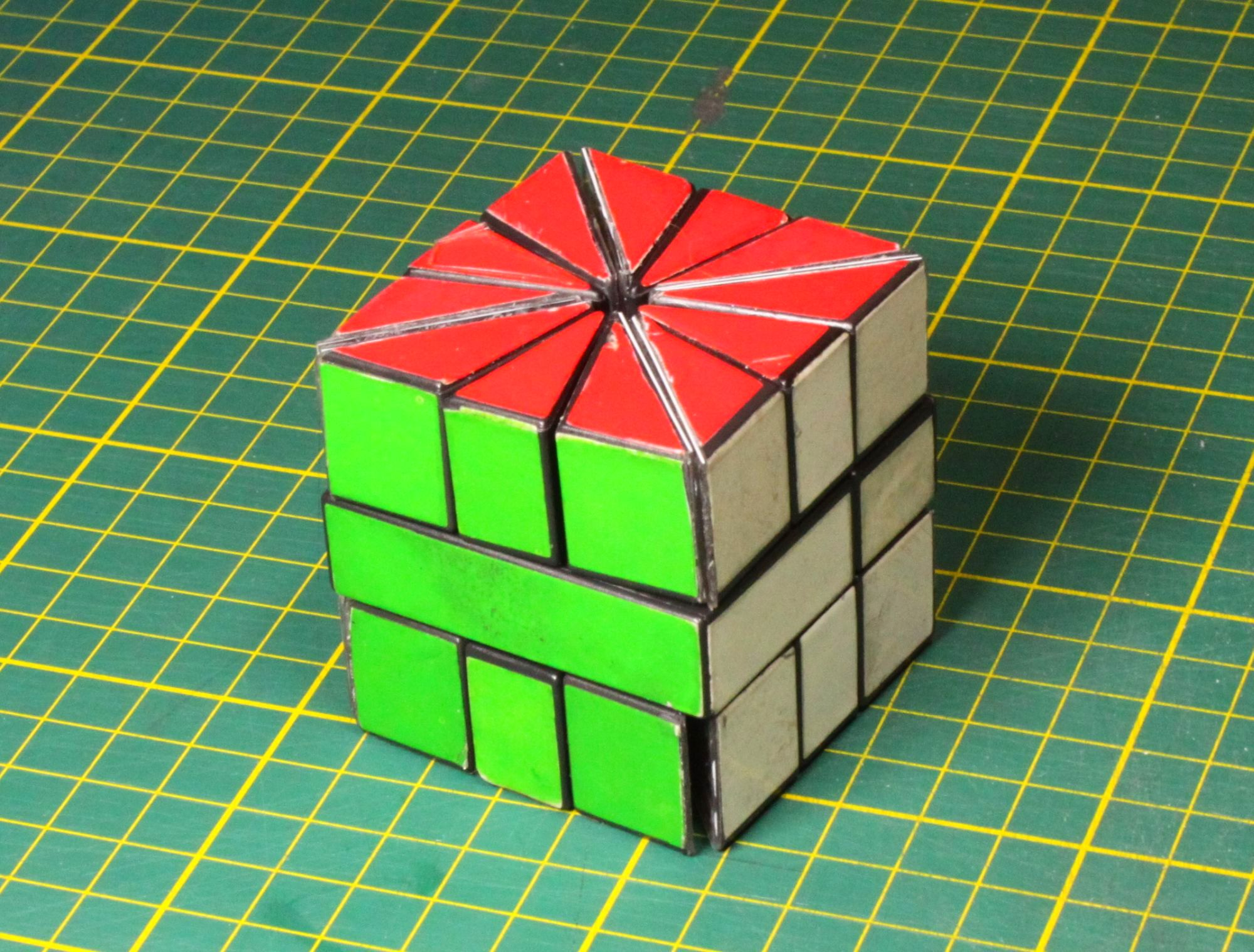
Square Two made by modification of the Square-1

A mass-produced Square-2, in a scrambled state.

The Square Two is yet another variation of the popular Square One puzzle, with extra cuts on the top and bottom layers. It is also currently marketed by Meffert's online store.

The Square Two is mechanically the same as a Square One, but the large corner wedges of the top and bottom layers are cut in half, effectively making the corner wedges as versatile as the edge wedges. This removes the locking issue present on the Square One, which in many ways makes the Square Two easier to solve (and scramble) than its predecessor.

=== Solution ===
The Square Two, like the Super Square One, is not much more difficult than the Square One. In many ways, it is actually easier considering one can always make a slice turn regardless of the positions of the top and bottom layers. It is solved just like cheese puzzles with different amount of sectors using tricycles.

=== Number of positions ===
There are a total of 24 wedge pieces on the puzzle.

Any permutation of the wedge pieces is possible, including even and odd permutations. This implies there are 24! = 620,448,401,733,239,439,360,000 (≈ 620 sextillion) possible permutations of these pieces.

However, the middle layer has two possible orientations for each position, increasing the number of positions by a factor of 2.

This would theoretically yield a grand total of 24! × 2 = 1,240,896,803,466,478,878,720,000 (≈ 1.2 septillion) possible positions for the puzzle, but since the layers have 12 different orientations for each position, some positions have been counted too many times this way. This reduces the number of positions by a factor of 144.

The final count is 24! ÷ 72 = 8,617,338,912,961,658,880,000 (≈ 8.6 sextillion) total possible positions.

== See also ==
- Combination puzzle
- Pocket Cube
- Rubik's Cube
- Rubik's Revenge
- Professor's Cube
- V-Cube 6
- V-Cube 7
- V-Cube 8
- Megaminx
