= Tuttminx =

Combination puzzle

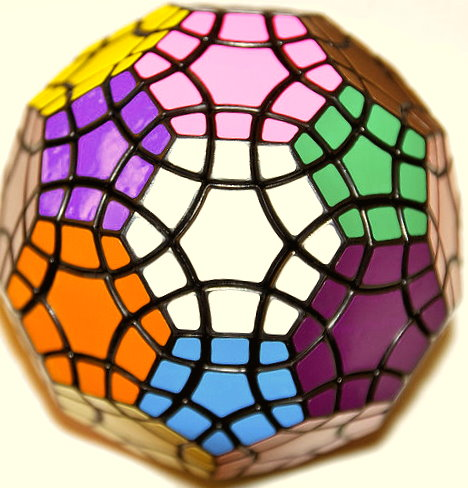
The original Tuttminx in its solved state.

A Tuttminx (/ˈtʊtmɪŋks/ or /ˈtʌtmɪŋks/) is a Rubik's Cube-like twisty puzzle, in the shape of a truncated icosahedron. It was invented by Lee Tutt in 2005. It has a total of 150 movable pieces to rearrange, compared to 20 movable pieces of the Rubik's Cube.

== Description ==
The Tuttminx has a total of 32 face centre pieces (12 pentagon and 20 hexagon), 60 corner pieces, and 90 edge pieces. The face centres each have a single colour, which identifies the colour of that face in the solved state. The edge pieces have two colours, and the corner pieces have three colours. Each hexagonal face contains a centre piece, 6 corner pieces, and 6 edge pieces, while each pentagonal face contains a centre piece, 5 corner pieces, and 5 edge pieces.

The puzzle twists around the faces: each twist rotates one face centre piece and moves all edge and corner pieces surrounding it. The pentagonal faces can be twisted 72° in either direction, while the hexagonal faces can be rotated 120°.

The purpose of the puzzle is to scramble the colours, and then restore it to its original state of having one colour per face.

== Number of combinations ==
The puzzle has 150 movable pieces: 60 corner pieces, 60 edge pieces that are adjacent to a pentagonal face (so-called pentagonal edges) and 30 edge pieces that are not (non-pentagonal edges). Only even permutations of all three types of pieces are possible (i.e. it is impossible to have only one pair of identical pieces swapped). Thus, there are 60!/2 possible ways to arrange the corner pieces, 60!/2 ways to arrange the pentagonal edges and 30!/2 ways to arrange the non-pentagonal edges.

All corner pieces have only one possible orientation, as do all pentagonal edge pieces. The non-pentagonal edge pieces all have 2 possible orientations each. Only even orientations of those are possible (meaning that it is impossible to have only one edge piece flipped over). This means there are 2^{29} ways to orientate the edge pieces.

The number of possible combinations on the Tuttminx is therefore equal to

$$\frac{60! \times 60! \times 30! \times 2^{29}}{8} \approx 1.2325 \times 10^{204}$$

The full number is 1 232 507 756 161 568 013 733 174 639 895 750 813 761 087 074 840 896 182 396 140 424 396 146 760 158 229 902 239 889 099 665 575 990 049 299 860 175 851 176 152 712 039 950 335 697 389 221 704 074 672 278 055 758 253 470 515 200 000 000 000 000 000 000 000 000 000 000 000 (about 1.2325 septensexagintillion on the short scale and 1.2325 quattuortrigintillion on the long scale).

== Variations ==
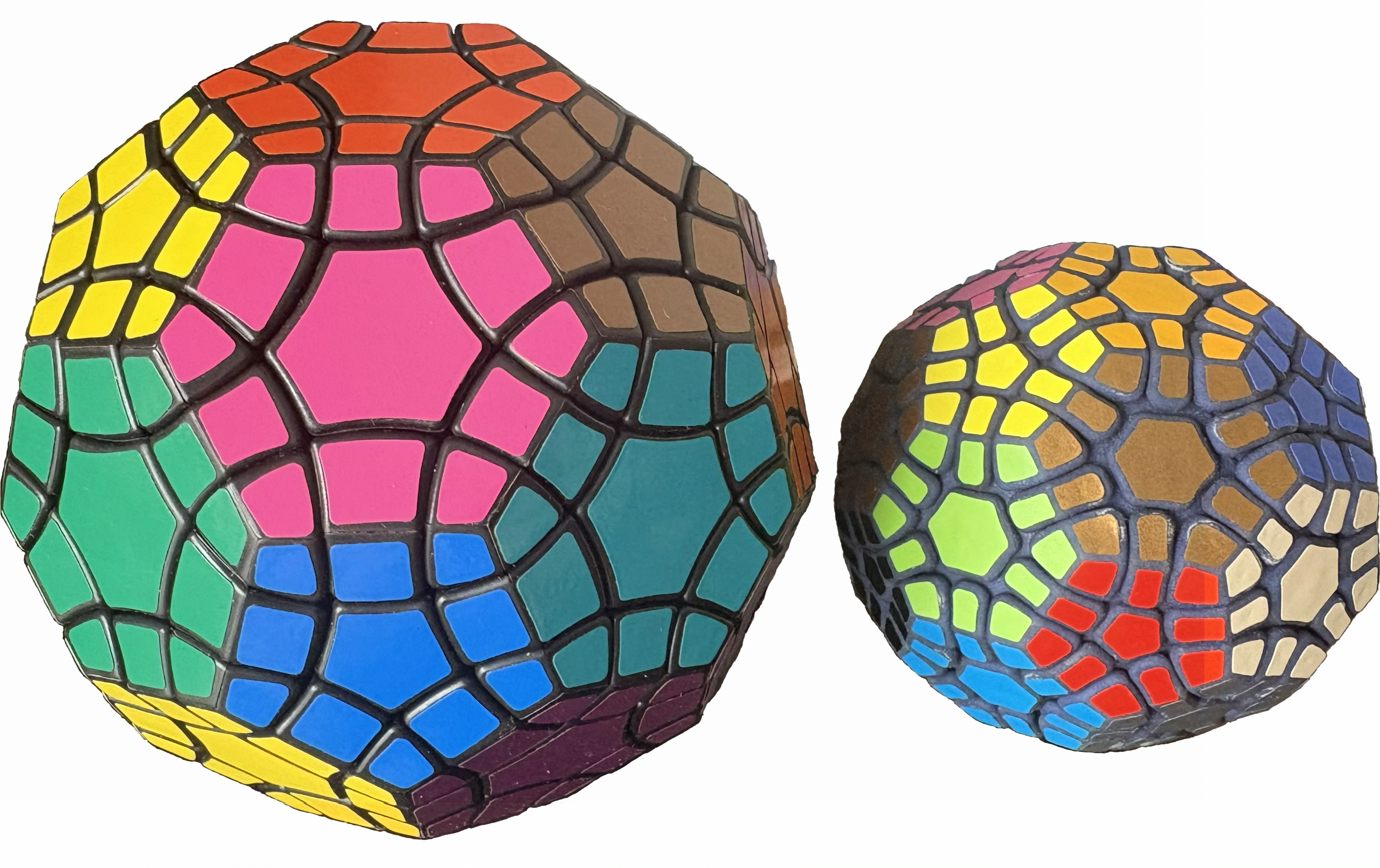
Tuttminx (left) and Futtminx (right)

There are a few variations of the Tuttminx that have been made. The most popular ones include:

- Void Tuttminx, which is a regular Tuttminx but without the face centre pieces;
- Rayminx (/ˈreɪmɪŋks/, also called Giga Tuttminx), which is a higher-order version of the Tuttminx;
- Futtminx, which was invented by Oskar van Deventer and has been designed so that the hexagonal faces can be rotated 60° and mix up with the pentagonal faces.
- Love bird, a 2x2x2 version of the Tuttminx.
- Tuttminx ball, also sticker variations of that.
- Chamfered dodecahedron tuttminx. It looks similar to the Tuttminx, but hexagons are located differently, they are distorted, and there are more of them (30 instead of 20).

== See also ==
- Rubik's Cube
- Megaminx
- Helicopter Cube
- Pyraminx Crystal
- Goldberg Polyhedron
