= Dogic =

Combination puzzle

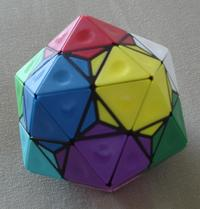
The 12-color Dogic

The Dogic (/ˈdɒdʒɪk/) is an icosahedron-shaped puzzle like the Rubik's Cube. The 5 triangles meeting at its tips may be rotated, or 5 entire faces (including the triangles) around the tip may be rotated. It has a total of 80 movable pieces to rearrange, compared to the 20 pieces in the Rubik's Cube.

== History ==
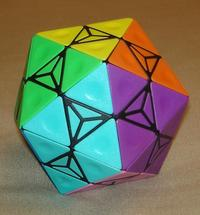
The 10-color Dogic

The Dogic was patented by Zsolt and Robert Vecsei in Hungary on 20 October 1993. The patent was granted 28 July 1998 (HU214709). It was originally sold by VECSO in two variants under the names "Dogic" and "Dogic 2", but was only produced in quantities far short of the demand.

In 2004, Uwe Mèffert acquired the plastic molds from its original manufacturer at the request of puzzle fans and collectors worldwide, and made another production run of the Dogics. These Dogics were first shipped in January 2005, and are now being sold by Meffert in his puzzle shop, Meffert's until September 2010 when the lack of interest for Meffert's Dogics made Uwe Meffert stop his Dogic production run.

According to Uwe Mèffert, 2000 units have been produced by him.

== Description ==
The basic design of the Dogic is an icosahedron cut into 60 triangular pieces around its 12 tips and 20 face centers. All 80 pieces can move relative to each other. There are also a good number of internal moving pieces inside the puzzle, which are necessary to keep it in one piece as its surface pieces are rearranged.

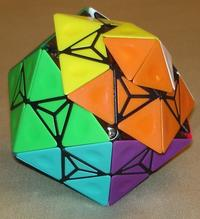
The 10-color Dogic, with the two possible layers of rotation slightly twisted.

There are two types of twists that it can undergo: a shallow twist which rotates the 5 triangles around a single tip, and a deep twist which rotates 5 entire faces (including the triangles around the tip) around the tip. The shallow twist moves the triangles between faces but keeps them around the same tip; the deeper twist moves the triangles between the 5 tips lying at the base of the rotated faces but keeps them on the same faces. Each triangle has a single color, while the face centers may have up to 3 colors, depending on the particular coloring scheme employed.

== Solutions ==
The solutions for the different versions of the Dogic differ.

The 12-color Dogic is the more challenging version, where the face centers must be rearranged to match the colors of the face centers in adjacent faces. The triangles must then match the corresponding colors in the face centers. The face centers are mathematically equivalent to the corner pieces of the Megaminx, and so the same algorithms may be used for solving either. The triangles are relatively easy to solve once the face centers are in place, because the 5 triangles per tip are identical in color and may be freely interchanged.

The 10-color Dogic is slightly less challenging, since there is no unique solved state: the face centers may be randomly placed relative to each other, and the result would still look 'solved'. However, it may still be desirable to put them in aesthetically pleasing arrangements, such as pairing up faces of the same color, as depicted in the second photograph. The triangles are slightly more tricky to solve than in the 12-color Dogic, because adjacent triangles in the solved state are not the same color and so cannot be freely interchanged.

The 5-color and 2-color Dogics are even less of a challenge, since there is a large number of identical pieces. These simpler versions cater to those puzzle fans who are not yet at the skill level to manage the full complexity of the 12-color Dogic.

== Number of combinations ==
Due to different numbers of visually identical pieces in the two versions of the puzzle, they each have a different number of possible combinations. There are 60 tip pieces and 20 centres with 3 orientations, giving a theoretical maximum of 60!·20!·3^{20} positions. This limit is not reached on either puzzle, due to reducing factors detailed below.

=== 12-color Dogic ===
1. Only even permutations of centres are possible (2)
2. The orientation of the first 19 centres determines the orientation of the last centre. (3)
3. Some tip pieces are indistinguishable (5!^{12})
4. The orientation of the puzzle does not matter (60): all 60 possible positions and orientations of the first center are equivalent because of the lack of fixed reference points.

This leaves $\frac{59!\times 20!\times 3^{19}}{2\times 5!^{12}} \approx 2.20\times 10^{82}$ positions for the 12-color Dogic.

The precise figure is 21 991 107 793 244 335 592 538 616 581 443 187 569 604 232 889 165 919 156 829 382 848 981 603 083 878 400 000 (roughly 22 sesvigintillion on the short scale or 22 tredecilliard on the long scale).

=== 10-color Dogic ===
1. Only even permutations of the centres are possible (2)
2. Centre orientation does not matter (3^{20})
3. Ten of the centres are visually identical to the other ten (2^{10})
4. Some tip pieces are indistinguishable (6!^{10})
5. The orientation of the puzzle does not matter (60)

This leaves $\frac{59!\times 20!}{2^{11}\times 6!^{10}} \approx 4.40\times 10^{66}$ positions for the 10-color Dogic.

The precise figure is 4 400 411 583 858 825 100 777 127 453 704 140 502 784 413 155 112 522 644 357 120 000 000 (roughly 4.4 unvigintillion on the short scale or 4.4 undecillion on the long scale).

== See also ==
- Rubik's Cube
- Pyraminx
- Skewb Diamond
- Impossiball
- Megaminx
- Combination puzzles
- Mechanical puzzles
