= V-Cube 8 =

8×8×8 version of Rubik's Cube

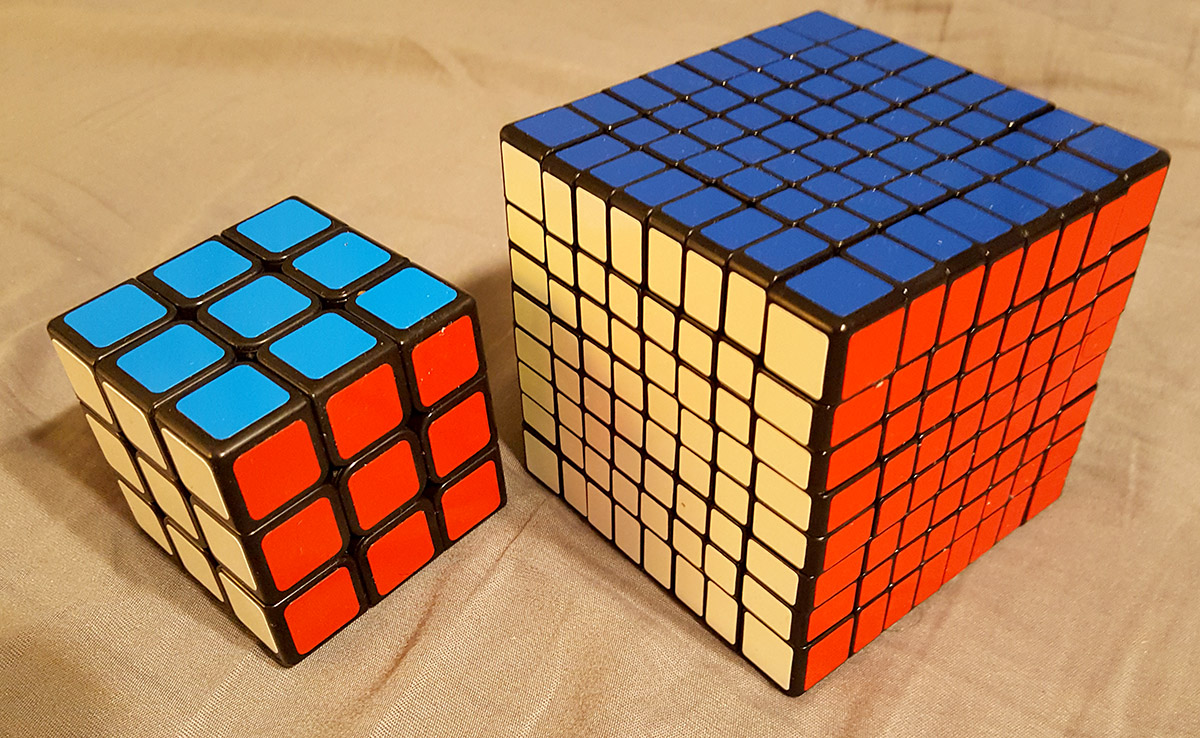
Shengshou 8×8×8 compared to a 3×3×3

The V-Cube 8 is an 8×8×8 version of the Rubik's Cube. Unlike the original puzzle (but like the 4×4×4 and 6×6×6 cubes), it has no fixed centers: the center facets (36 per face) are free to move to different positions. The design was covered by Panagiotis Verdes' patent from 2007 but Verdes Innovations SA did not produce it for sale until 2014. Other manufacturers released their own versions of the puzzle much earlier.

Methods for solving the 3×3×3 cube work for the edges and corners of the 8×8×8 cube, as long as one has correctly identified the relative positions of the colors — since the center facets can no longer be used for identification.

== Mechanics ==
The puzzle consists of 296 pieces ("cubies") on the surface. There are also 84 movable pieces entirely hidden within the interior of the cube, as well as six fixed pieces attached to the central "spider" frame. The V-Cube 9 uses essentially the same mechanism, except that on the latter these hidden pieces (corresponding to the center rows) are made visible.

There are 216 center pieces which show one color each, 72 edge pieces which show two colors each, and eight corner pieces which show three colors. Each piece (or sextet of edge pieces) shows a unique color combination, but not all combinations are present (for example, there is no edge piece with both red and orange sides, since red and orange are on opposite sides of the solved Cube). The location of these cubes relative to one another can be altered by twisting the layers of the Cube 90°, 180°, or 270°, but the location of the colored sides relative to one another in the completed state of the puzzle cannot be altered: it is fixed by the distribution of Color combinations on edge and corner pieces.

Currently, the 8×8×8 is produced with black or white plastic as a base, with red opposite orange, blue opposite green, and yellow opposite white or black. The V-Cube version has one center piece marked the letter V.

The V-Cube has rounded sides like the V-Cube 7, whereas the Chinese versions have flat faces. On all versions, the outermost layers are thicker than the middle ones. Without this alteration, there would be no way to connect the corner pieces to the rest of the mechanism.

=== Permutations ===
There are 8 corners, 72 edges, and 216 centers.

Any permutation of the corners is possible, including odd permutations. Seven of the corners can be independently rotated, and the orientation of the eighth depends on the other seven, giving 8!×3^{7} combinations.

There are 216 centers, consisting of nine sets of 24 pieces each. Within each set there are four centers of each color. Centers from one set cannot be exchanged with those from another set. Each set can be arranged in 24! different ways. Assuming that the four centers of each color in each set are indistinguishable, the number of permutations is reduced to 24!/(24^{6}) arrangements. The reducing factor comes about because there are 24 ways to arrange the four pieces of a given color. This is raised to the sixth power because there are six colors. The total number of center permutations is the permutations of a single set raised to the ninth power, 24!^{9}/(24^{54}).

There are 72 edges, consisting of 24 inner, 24 intermediate, and 24 outer edges. These cannot be flipped, due to the internal shape of the pieces, nor can an edge from one set exchange places with an edge from another set. The six edges in each matching sextet are distinguishable, since corresponding edges are mirror images of each other. Any permutation of the edges in each set is possible, including odd permutations, giving 24! arrangements for each set or 24!^{3} total, regardless of the position or orientation of any other pieces.

Assuming that the cube does not have a fixed orientation in space, and that the permutations resulting from rotating the cube without twisting it are considered identical, the number of permutations is reduced by a factor of 24. This is because the 24 possible positions and orientations of the first corner are equivalent because of the lack of fixed centers. This factor does not appear when calculating the permutations of N×N×N cubes where N is odd, since those puzzles have fixed centers which identify the cube's spatial orientation.

This gives a total number of permutations of

$$\frac{8! \times 3^7 \times 24!^{12}}{24^{55}} \approx 3.52 \times 10^{217}$$

The entire number is 35 173 780 923 109 452 777 509 592 367 006 557 398 539 936 328 978 098 352 427 605 879 843 998 663 990 903 628 634 874 024 098 344 287 402 504 043 608 416 113 016 679 717 941 937 308 041 012 307 368 528 117 622 006 727 311 360 000 000 000 000 000 000 000 000 000 000 000 000 000 000 000 000.

The V-Cube has one center piece marked with a V, which distinguishes it from the other three in its set. This increases the number of patterns by a factor of four to 1.41×10^{218}, although any of the four possible positions for this piece could be regarded as correct.

== Solutions ==
There are a number of methods that can be used to solve a V-Cube 8. One method is to first group the center pieces of common colors together, then to match up edges that show the same two colors. Once this is done, turning only the outer layers of the cube allows it to be solved like a 3×3×3 cube. However, certain positions that cannot be solved on a standard 3×3×3 cube may be reached. For instance, a single sextet of edges may be inverted, or the cube may appear to have an odd permutation (that is, two pieces must be swapped, which is not possible on the 3×3×3 cube). These situations are known as parity errors, and require special algorithms to be solved.

Another similar approach to solving this cube is to first pair the edges, and then the centers. This, too, is vulnerable to the parity errors described above.

Other methods solve the cube by solving a cross and the centers, but not solving any of the edges and corners not needed for the cross, then the other edges would be placed similar to the 3×3 Fridrich method.

Some methods are designed to avoid the parity errors described above. For instance, solving the corners and edges first and the centers last would avoid such parity errors. Once the rest of the cube is solved, any permutation of the center pieces can be solved. Note that it is possible to apparently exchange a pair of face centers by cycling three face centers, two of which are visually identical.

== Records ==
The World Cube Association does not keep records for this puzzle. Ethan Cho claims the unofficial world record single with a time of 2:59.44.

== See also ==
- Combination puzzles
- Pocket Cube (2×2×2)
- Rubik's Cube (3×3×3)
- Rubik's Revenge (4×4×4)
- Professor's Cube (5×5×5)
- V-Cube 6 (6×6×6)
- V-Cube 7 (7×7×7)
