= Uwe Mèffert =

German puzzle designer and inventor (1939–2022)

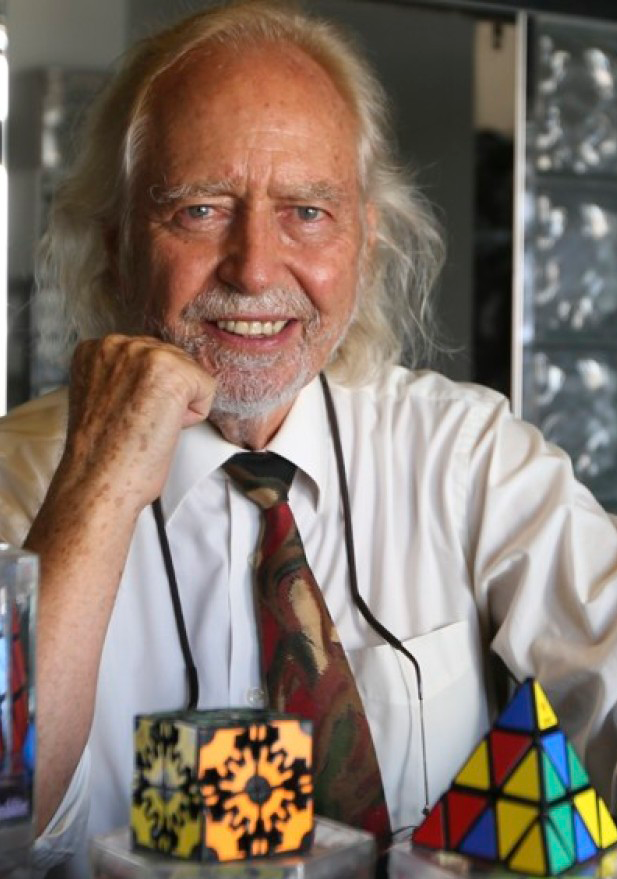
Uwe Mèffert

Uwe Mèffert (28 November 1939 – 30 April 2022) was a German puzzle designer and inventor. He manufactured and sold mechanical puzzles in the style of Rubik's Cube since the 'cube craze' of the 1980s. His first design was the Pyraminx – which he had developed before the original Rubik's Cube was invented. He created his own puzzle company and helped bring to market the Megaminx, Skewb, Skewb Diamond and many other puzzles.

== Puzzle history ==
=== Invention of the Pyraminx ===
In the early 1970s, Mèffert was interested in whether pyramids, cubes and other shapes might influence one's health and bio-energy flows. Mèffert constructed balsa wood polyhedra and found the gentle stroking of the apexes of the various shapes had a gentle massaging and stimulating influence and instilled a sense of peace, relaxation, and calm. After playing around with this idea for a while, he cut the solids into symmetric slices and attached them with rubber bands to a center ball. With the aid of his brother (an engineer), he was able to develop a simple mechanism that allowed the parts to move relative to each other. He made a few such devices and found them soothing to play with and helpful for meditation:

"I made five basic polygon objects, a tetrahedron, icosahedron, dodecahedron, etc, out of balsa wood, by cutting pieces and connecting them with some rubber bands and hooks. They didn’t have any colours because they were not toys. They were just things that I could use for several days and see if the different shapes had an effect on the human body."

He did not think anyone else would be interested in the idea, and put the shapes away and forgot about them until Ernő Rubik's Cube became a worldwide sensation in the early 1980s. Mèffert's friends persuaded him to travel to Hong Kong in early 1981, where he met Dennis Ting Hok-shou of the Hong Kong Toys Association. Ting selected the pyramid puzzle and helped Mèffert produce an acrylic prototype. After meeting with Japanese toy companies, Tomy Toys agreed to market the brainteaser. The resulting puzzle, the Pyraminx, sold more than 10 million units that year, and 90 million within three years.

=== Puzzle company ===
Uwe Mèffert became deeply involved in the production and marketing end of his Pyraminx, and came into contact with other inventors, and decided it would be a good idea to help manufacture and market their puzzle ideas. Mèffert established his own company in Hong Kong: Meffert’s Puzzles & Games. Mèffert bought the patent rights for the dodecahedron puzzle, and released it under the name of the Megaminx. Similarly he produced the first Skewb (invented by Tony Durham). Since that time, Mèffert and his associates have created more than 350 rotating mechanical puzzles and modifications.

Mèffert has produced puzzle designs by Tony Fisher, including the Golden Cube, and Oskar van Deventer, including the Gear Cube. More recently he licensed and re-released designs from other manufacturers, such as Dogic.

Mèffert also created his own version of sudoku. In addition to the standard sudoku rules, the two major diagonals must also contain the numerals from 1 to 9. Additionally, a Chinese magic square is hidden somewhere in the solution. He named this puzzle Kokonotsu, Japanese for nine.

== Biography ==
Mèffert was born in Wernigerode in the Harz Mountains of Germany on 28 November 1939. Mèffert was the son of Otto Oscar Wilhelm Rudolph Mèffert and Emmy Johanna Frieda Von-Vorkauf. He was educated in Heidelberg, Germany, Geelong, Australia, and Bern, Switzerland. He resided in Hong Kong since the early 1980s, as well as spending much time in Australasia researching human and animal nutrition. He was married to Jing Mèffert; they have three children: Michelle, Andrew and Ulrich, and at least two grandchildren.

Mèffert died 30 April 2022 due to complications while recovering from COVID-19.
