= Pyramorphix =

Tetrahedral puzzle similar to the Rubik's Cube

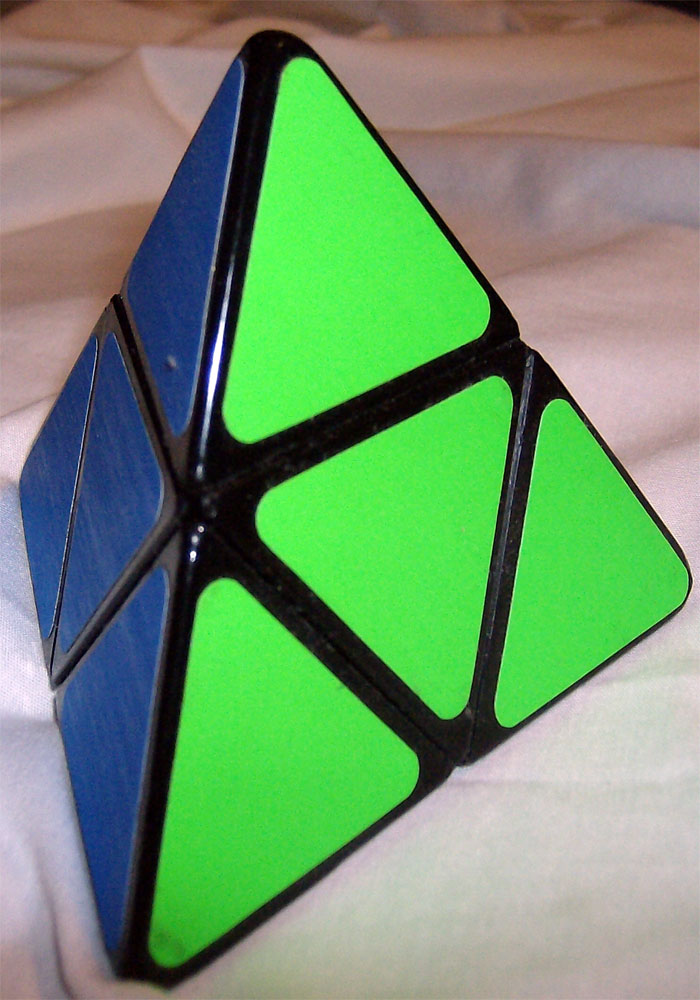
The Pyramorphix in its solved state

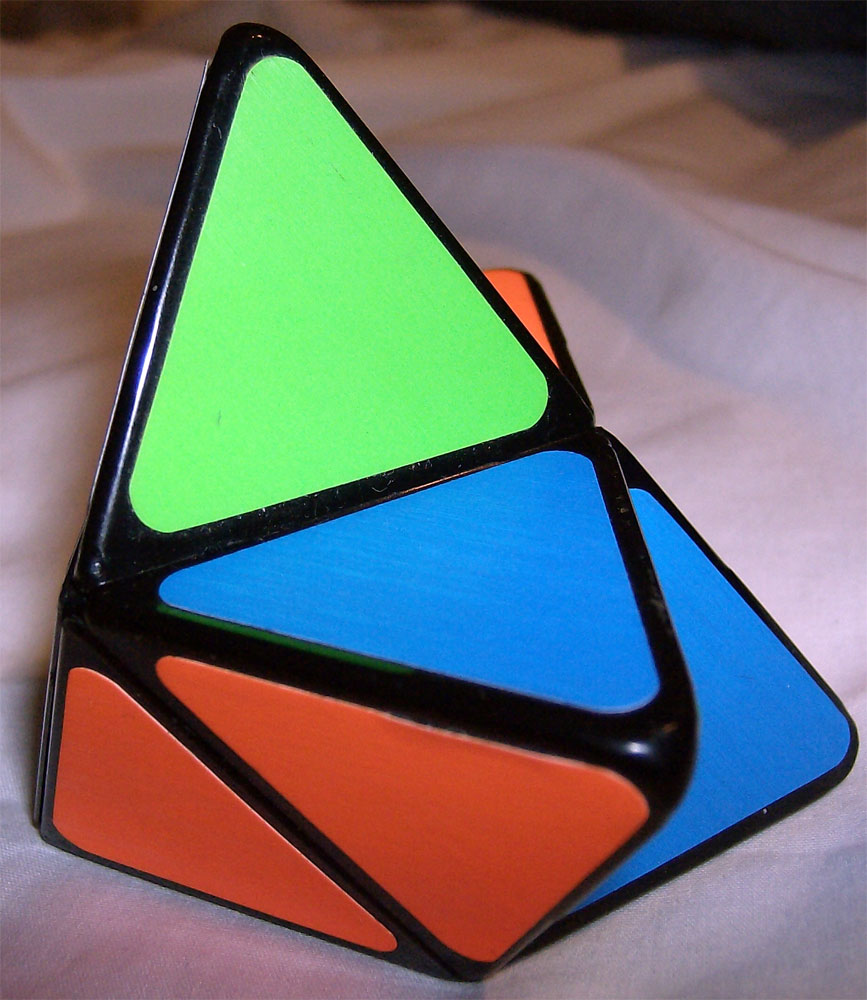
The Pyramorphix, scrambled

The Pyramorphix (/ˌpɪrəˈmɔːrfɪks/), also called Pyramorphinx, is a tetrahedral puzzle similar to the Rubik's Cube. It has a total of 8 movable pieces to rearrange, compared to the 20 of the Rubik's Cube. Although it looks like a trivially simple version of the Pyraminx, it is an edge-turning puzzle with the mechanism identical to that of the Pocket Cube.

== Description ==
At first glance, the Pyramorphix appears to be a trivial puzzle. It resembles the Pyraminx, and its appearance would suggest that only the four corners could be rotated. In fact, the puzzle is a specially shaped 2×2×2 cube. Four of the cube's corners are reshaped into pyramids and the other four are reshaped into triangles. The result of this is a puzzle that changes shape as it is turned.

The original name for the Pyramorphix was "The Junior Pyraminx." This was altered to reflect the "Shape Changing" aspect of the puzzle which makes it appear less like the 2×2×2 Cube. "Junior" also made it sound less desirable to an adult customer. The only remaining reference to the name "Junior Pyraminx" is on Uwe Mèffert's website-based solution which still has the title "jpmsol.html".

The purpose of the puzzle is to scramble the colors and the shape, and then restore it to its original state of being a tetrahedron with one color per face.

== Number of combinations ==
The puzzle is available either with stickers or plastic tiles on the faces. Both have a ribbed appearance, giving a visible orientation to the flat pieces. This results in 3,674,160 combinations, the same as the 2×2×2 cube.

However, if there were no means of identifying the orientation of those pieces, the number of combinations would be reduced. There would be 8! ways to arrange the pieces, divided by 24 to account for the lack of center pieces, and there would be 3^{4} ways to rotate the four pyramidal pieces.

$$\frac{8! \times 3^4}{24}=136080$$

The Pyramorphix can be rotated around three axes by multiples of 90°. The corners cannot rotate individually as on the Pyraminx. The Pyramorphix rotates in a way that changes the position of center pieces not only with other center pieces but also with corner pieces, leading to a variety of shapes.

== Master Pyramorphix ==
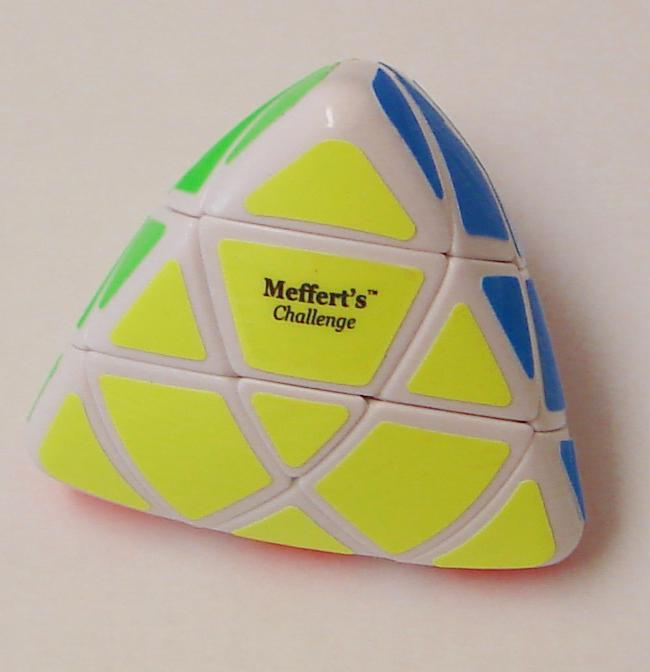
The Master Pyramorphix

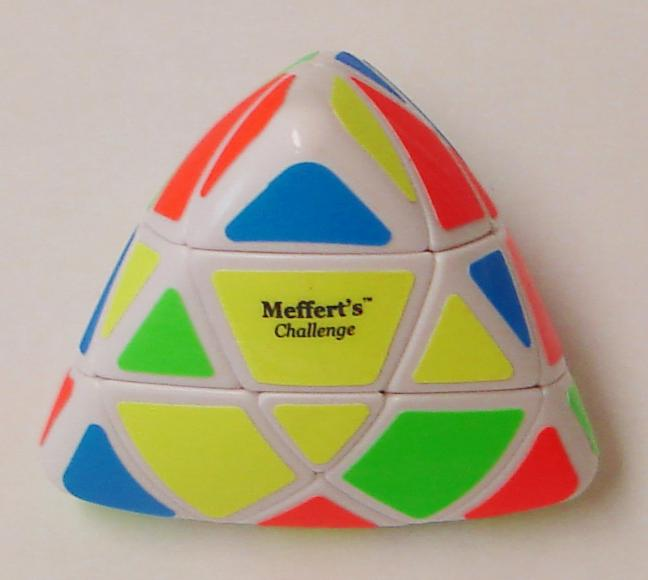
The Master Pyramorphix, color-scrambled

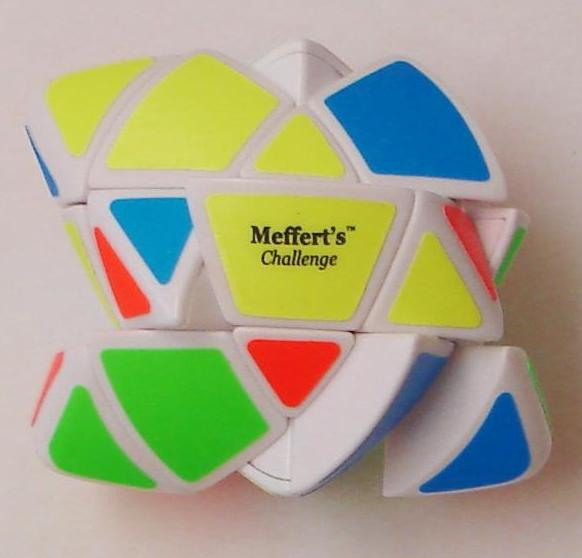
The Master Pyramorphix, color- and shape- scrambled

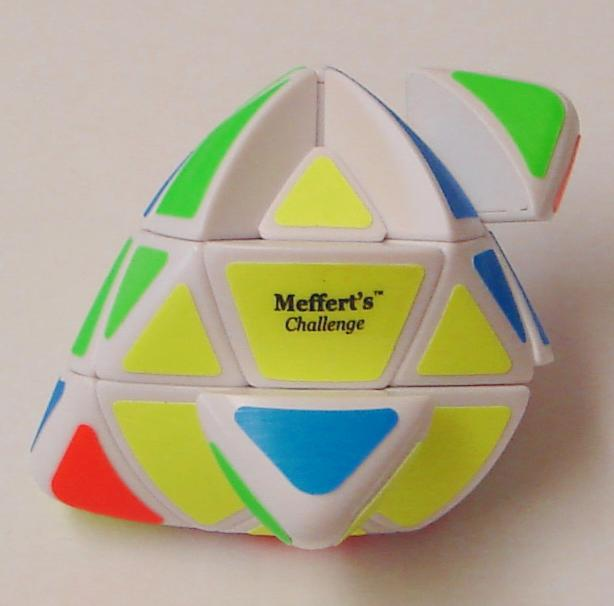
The Master Pyramorphix, partially solved

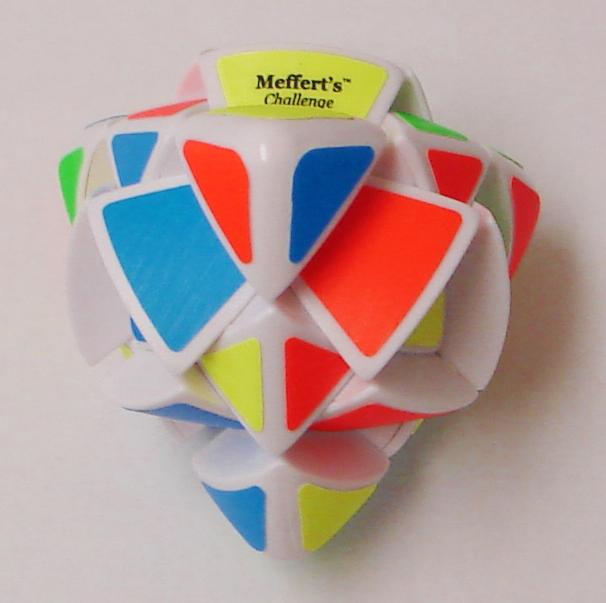
The Master Pyramorphix, with maximal face-piece flip, equivalent to the "superflip" configuration of the 3x3x3 Rubik's Cube

The Master Pyramorphix, informally referred to the Mastermorphix, is a more complex variant of the Pyramorphix. Like the Pyramorphix, it is an edge-turning tetrahedral puzzle capable of changing shape as it is twisted, leading to a large variety of irregular shapes. Several different variants have been made, including flat-faced custom-built puzzles by puzzle fans and Uwe Mèffert's commercially produced pillowed variant (pictured), sold through his puzzle shop, Meffert's.

The puzzle consists of 4 corner pieces, 4 face centers, 6 edge pieces, and 12 non-center face pieces. Being an edge-turning puzzle, the edge pieces only rotate in place, while the rest of the pieces can be permuted. The face centers and corner pieces are interchangeable because they are both corners although they are shaped differently, and the non-center face pieces may be flipped, leading to a wide variety of exotic shapes as the puzzle is twisted. If only 180° turns are made, it is possible to scramble only the colors while retaining the puzzle's tetrahedral shape. When 90° and 180° turns are made this puzzle can "shape shift″.

In spite of superficial similarities, the only way that this puzzle is related to the Pyraminx is that they are both "twisty puzzles"; the Pyraminx is a face-turning puzzle. On the Mastermorphix the corner pieces are non-trivial; they cannot be simply rotated in place to the right orientation.

=== Solutions ===
Despite its appearance, the puzzle is in fact equivalent to a shape modification of the original 3x3x3 Rubik's Cube. Its 4 corner pieces on the corners and 4 corner pieces on the face centers together are equivalent to the 8 corner pieces of the Rubik's Cube, its 6 edge pieces are equivalent to the face centers of the Rubik's Cube, and its non-center face pieces are equivalent to the edge pieces of the Rubik's Cube. Thus, the same methods used to solve the Rubik's Cube may be used to solve the Master Pyramorphix, with a few minor differences: the center pieces are sensitive to orientation because they have two colors, unlike the usual coloring scheme used for the Rubik's Cube, and the face centers are not sensitive to orientation (however when in the "wrong" orientation parity errors may occur). In effect, it behaves as a Rubik's Cube with a non-standard coloring scheme where center piece orientation matters, and the orientation of 4 of the 8 corner pieces do not, technically, matter.

Unlike the Square One, another shape-changing puzzle, the most straightforward solutions of the Master Pyramorphix do not involve first restoring the tetrahedral shape of the puzzle and then restoring the colors; most of the algorithms carried over from the 3x3x3 Rubik's Cube translate to shape-changing permutations of the Master Pyramorphix. Some methods, such as the equivalent of Philip Marshall's "Ultimate Solution", show a gradual progression in shape as the solution progresses; first the non-center face pieces are put into place, resulting in a partial restoration of the tetrahedral shape except at the face centers and corners, and then the complete restoration of tetrahedral shape as the face centers and corners are solved.

=== Number of combinations ===
There are four corners and four face centers. These may be interchanged with each other in 8! different ways. There are 3^{7} ways for these pieces to be oriented, since the orientation of the last piece depends on the preceding seven, and the texture of the stickers makes the face center orientation visible. There are twelve non-central face pieces. These can be flipped in 2^{11} ways and there are 12!/2 ways to arrange them. The three pieces of a given color are distinguishable due to the texture of the stickers. There are six edge pieces which are fixed in position relative to one another, each of which has four possible orientations. If the puzzle is solved apart from these pieces, the number of edge twists will always be even, making 4^{6}/2 possibilities for these pieces.

$${8! \times 3^7 \times 12! \times 2^9 \times 4^6} \approx 8.86 \times 10^{22}$$

The full number is 88580102706155225088000.

However, if the stickers were smooth the number of combinations would be reduced. There would be 3^{4} ways for the corners to be oriented, but the face centers would not have visible orientations. The three non-central face pieces of a given color would be indistinguishable. Since there are six ways to arrange the three pieces of the same color and there are four colors, there would be 2^{11}×12!/6^{4} possibilities for these pieces.

$$\frac {8! \times 3^4 \times 12! \times 2^{10} \times 4^6}{6^4} \approx 5.06 \times 10^{18}$$

The full number is 5062877383753728000.

== See also ==
- Skewb Diamond
- Skewb Ultimate
- Combination puzzles
- Mechanical puzzles
