= Katsuhiko Okamoto =

Japanese inventor

Katsuhiko Okamoto is a Japanese inventor who specializes in modifications of the Rubik's Cube. Since 2001 he has created 31 such puzzles.

== Okamoto Cubes ==
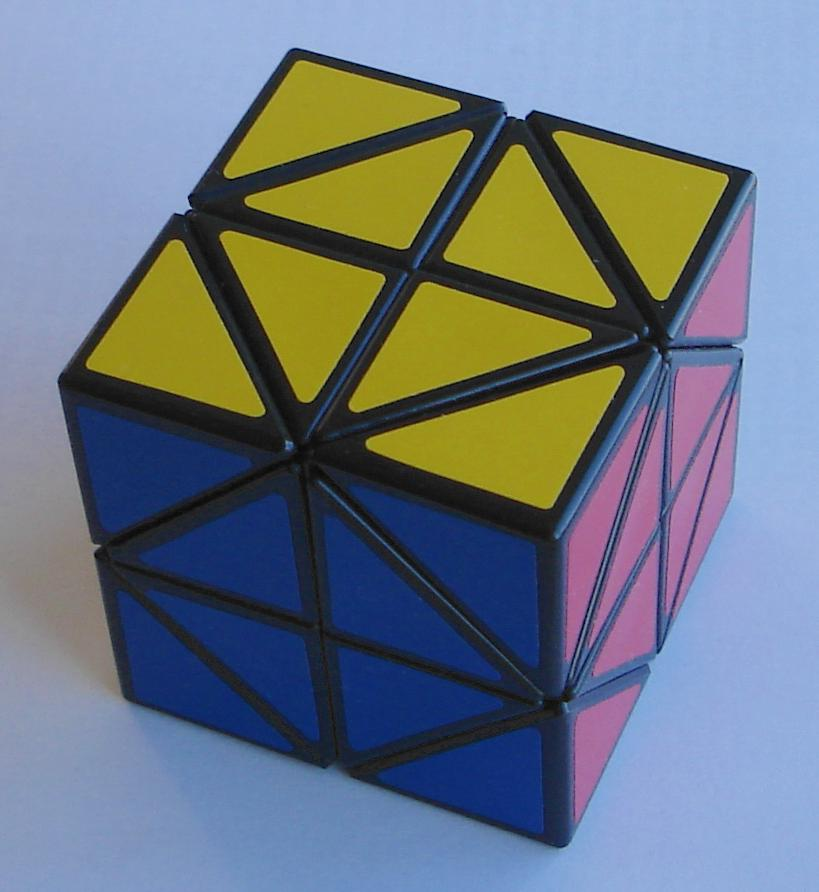
The Bevel/Helicopter Cube, developed by Okamoto and Adam Cowan independently.

An incomplete list of Okamoto's inventions:

A solved Scramble Cube.

- Floppy Cube - a 3x3x1 cube
- Scramble Cube - a modified Floppy Cube, with a diamond-shaped centrepiece
- Slimtower - a 2x2x3 cube, Okamoto's first invention
- Void Cube - a hollow 3x3x3 cube without centrepieces, which uses a rail mechanism to move cubies
- Bevel Cube - identical to the independently developed Helicopter Cube, which appears to be a 2x2x2 cube with 8 triangles per face
- Latch Cube - a 3x3x3 with directional constraints on its edges.
