= Gear Cube =

3D combination puzzle based on the Rubik's Cube

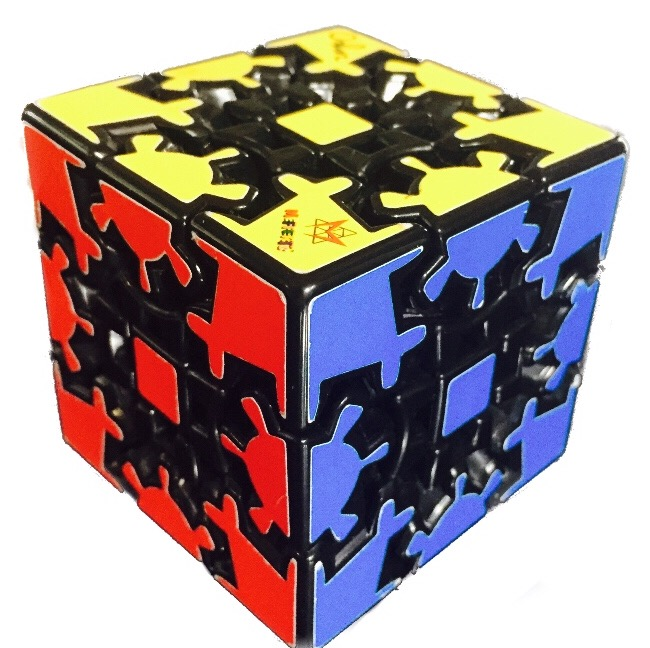
- Other names: Caution Cube
- Type: Combination puzzle
- Invented by: Oskar van Deventer
- Company: Meffert's
- Country: Netherlands

The Gear Cube is a 3-D combination puzzle designed and created by Dutch puzzle maker Oskar van Deventer based on an idea by Bram Cohen. It was initially produced by Shapeways in 2009 and known as "Caution Cube" due to the likelihood of getting one's fingers stuck between the gears while speedcubing. Later, in 2010, it was mass-produced by Meffert's as the "Gear Cube".

Compared to the original Rubik's Cube, this cube uses a complete gear mechanism. It requires six 180° turns to complete one rotation, resulting in a twisty puzzle. The design of the Gear Cube places all gears externally in order for the mechanics to be seen. While looking rather formidable at first sight, it is nevertheless simpler to solve than the original Rubik's Cube.

There are two objectives when solving the cube. The first goal is taking the mixed-up puzzle back to its original cubic state. The second goal is to actually solve the puzzle by arranging each side back to its own beginning color.

== Mechanics ==
The Gear Cube is made almost completely out of gears and has a total of 41,472 possible permutations.

Each face is permitted to turn in only 180° increments or half turns. Due to the gears not making full rotations along with the sides they are attached to, 90° turns are impossible. This is why all of the algorithms involve either half turns or full rotations.

It has six stationary center pieces, each with a different color, that always stay opposite another specific center. Each center piece determines what color that face will be. The centers are exactly based on the original Rubik's Cube. They are connected by a three dimensional cross with screws and springs allowing for adjustments in tension.

== Solution ==
=== Move notation ===
Many cube solvers use the same notation when completing a cube, whether they are working on the original Rubik's Cube, the Pyraminx, or even the Gear Cube. They are most likely using "Singmaster notation", originally developed by David Singmaster. It allows for algorithms to be written in a way that a solver can use it no matter what side of the cube they are on.

- F (Front): the side currently facing the solver
- B (Back): the side opposite the front
- U (Up): the side above or on top of the front side
- D (Down): the side opposite the top, underneath the cube
- L (Left): the side directly to the left of the front
- R (Right): the side directly to the right of the front

When a prime symbol ( ' ) follows a letter it indicates that move must be rotated in a counter-clockwise fashion. However, if the prime symbol is absent after the letter, that move must be rotated in a clockwise fashion.

For example: R - rotate the right side clockwise. R' - rotate the right side counter-clockwise.

Sometimes in an algorithm there might be a number following a letter. That is just saying how many times to rotate that specific side.

For example: F2 means rotate the front side two times in a clockwise direction.

There is also a possibility of a set of moves in parentheses followed by a number. Meaning do that set of moves a certain number of times in a row.

For example: (R' F B L') 2 means complete the set once, then repeat a second time.

==== Algorithms ====
When solving the Gear Cube, there are only two basic algorithms needed:

1. Switch an upper-front edge gear with the upper-back edge gear directly across from it: R2 U R2'
2. Position all edge gears evenly into a cubic state: R3 (Repeat as necessary).

=== Solving steps ===
Solving the Gear Cube is based more on the observations the solver makes. There are only two algorithms needed to solve the cube, so finding the patterns is a key skill. However, using the algorithms is simple once the patterns are located.

Phase 1: Solve the corners: (This step is intuitive; there are no algorithms to complete this step.)

Step 1: Get two corners next to each other that belong next to each other. Do any moves necessary to achieve this position (green corner paired with another green corner, both having matching side colors)

Step 2: As soon as two green corners are paired together, the other set of green corners should be paired as well, but is most likely located somewhere else on the cube.

- Pair both sets of green corners to complete the green side, then rotate the opposite (blue) side until all of the sides corners match.

- Rotate each side until those corners match the center piece color.

Phase 2: Position the edges: (first algorithm used)

Step 1: Find two gear edge pieces across from each other that need to be swapped in order for each edge to correspond with the color of the two sides they lie between.

- Orientate the cube so those two edges are on the top side (upper-front and upper-back) and complete the following algorithm: (R2 U) 2.

Step 2: Repeat the previous step until all edge pieces are in the correct position (edge colors match the colors of the sides it is between).

Step 3, only for the Gear Cube Ultimate: To rotate two stickers on the top side (upper-front and upper-back) use the following algorithm: R2 U2 R2 U2 R2.

Phase 3: Orient the edges: (second algorithm used)

Step 1: Rotate all sides until the cube is back in a cubic state using the following algorithm: R4 (repeat as necessary).

Sometimes, after this step, you may end up with all four edges in both top and bottom layer flipped instead. If this happens, orient cube with four flipped edges in the front face and use the following algorithm: R U R U R U

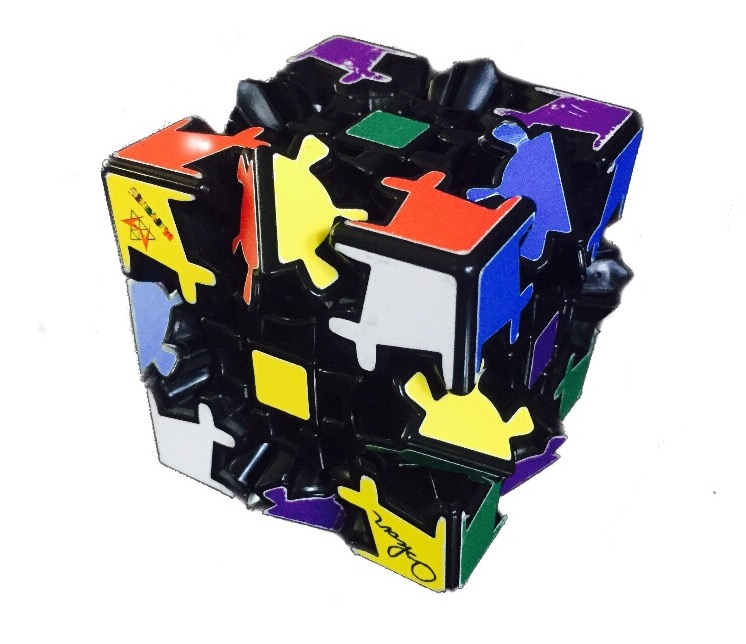
Beginning mix

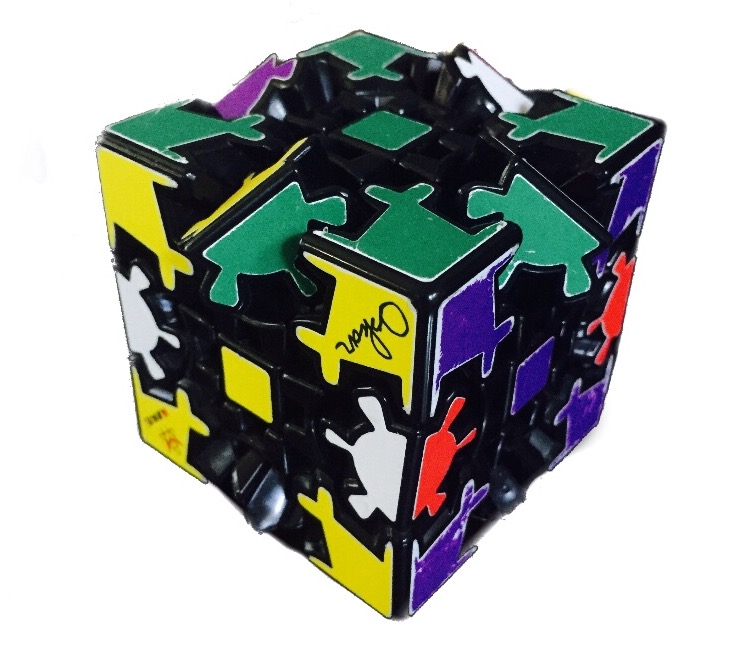
End of Phase 1

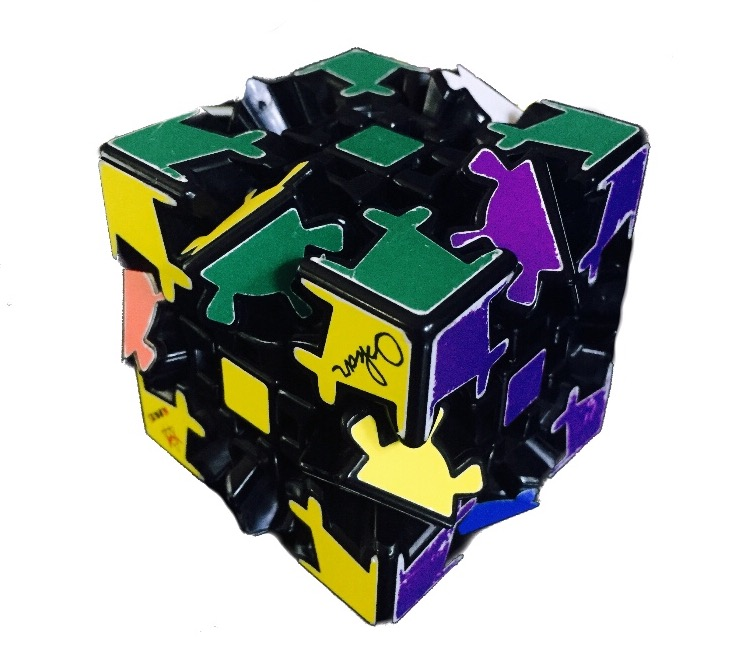
End of Phase 2

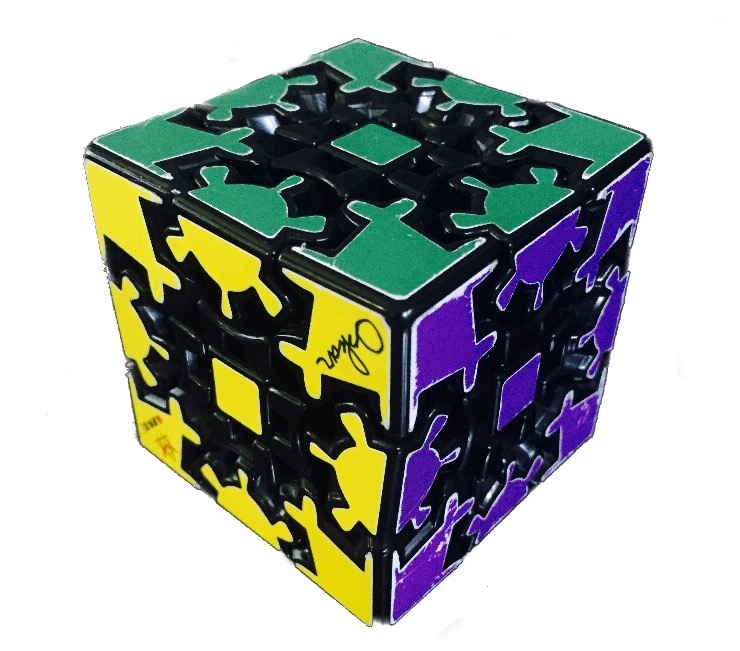
End of Phase 3

== Variations ==
There are multiple variations of the Gear Cube, ranging from the most simple, a 2x2 Gear Shift, to the most complicated, the 3x3 Even Less Gears Cube. Three 3x3 cubes are very similar to the original: the Gear Cube Extreme, the Gear Cube Ultimate, and the Even Less Gears Cube.

Gear Cube Extreme: Unlike the original Gear Cube with 12 total gears, the Gear Cube Extreme (also known as the Anisotropic Cube) has only eight gears. The top and bottom rows remain gear cogs, whereas the middle layer edge cogs have been removed. Taking away the middle layer cogs and replacing them with standard edges allows for different movement between rows. Due to the added straight edges, the cube can now make 90° turns on two rows and as well as 180° turns on four rows.

Gear Cube Ultimate: This cube is built exactly like the Gear Cube Extreme with only eight gears. The only difference is that it added Tony Fisher style stickers to the four inner pieces on each side, making it one step more difficult to correctly orient the six sides. A common issue while solving this cube is having the entire puzzle complete except for the newly added stickers being mismatched with different sides.

Even Less Gears: The only 3x3 type of Gear Cube with a total of four gears. It takes another four gears out and replaces them with standard edges. As the number of gears get fewer and fewer, the difficulty level rises. So four sides can make 90° turns whereas the fifth and sixth sides are using the gear cogs giving only one option being a 180° turn.

Gear Ball: This cube has two sets of edges. The outer edges are gear shaped with six teeth, and a black barrier on it. The inner edges are smaller and not circular, and only have two teeth. In addition, the corners have a three-pronged barrier. This cube is manufactured by Mefferts, the inventor of the Pyraminx.

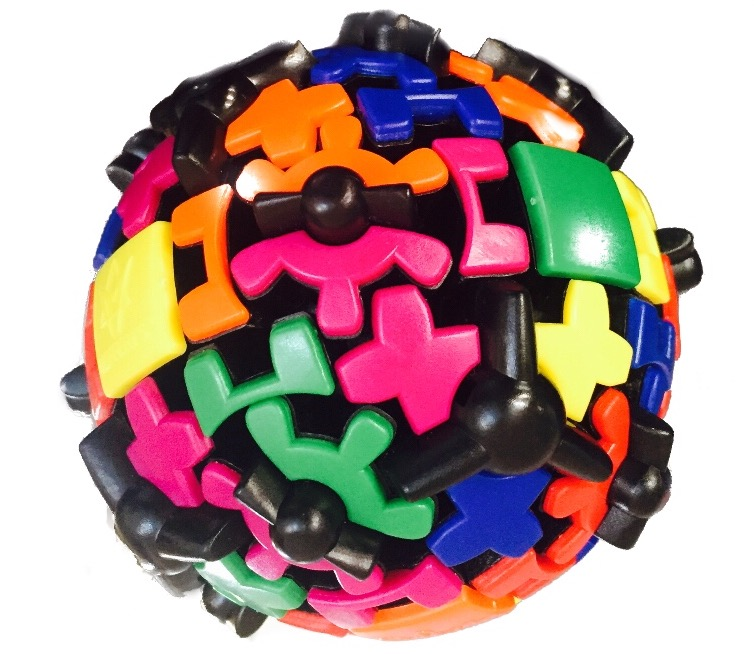
Gear Ball

=== Variants ===
- Gear Shift
- Skewb Shift
- Gear Egg
- Gear Cube Extreme
- Gear Cube Ultimate
- Even Less Gears Cube
- Gear Barrel
- Gear MasterMorphix
- Gear Pyraminx
- Gear Minx
