= Hanayama =

Japanese toy company

Hanayama is a Japanese toy company founded in 1933. They are best known for their series of metal disassembly puzzles, "Huzzle" (also known as "Cast Puzzle"), which include reproductions of older designs, and new puzzles by other inventors such as Oskar van Deventer and Akio Yamamoto. Hanayama has a scale to measure the difficulty of their puzzles. It goes from one to six, one being "fun" and six being "grandmaster". Besides selling Huzzle puzzles, Hanayama also has a series of metal chess piece puzzles. Some of the most popular Hanayama puzzles are: Cast Marble, Cast Infinity, Cast Quartet, Cast Coaster, and Cast NEWS.
