= Pyraminx Duo =

Twisty puzzle

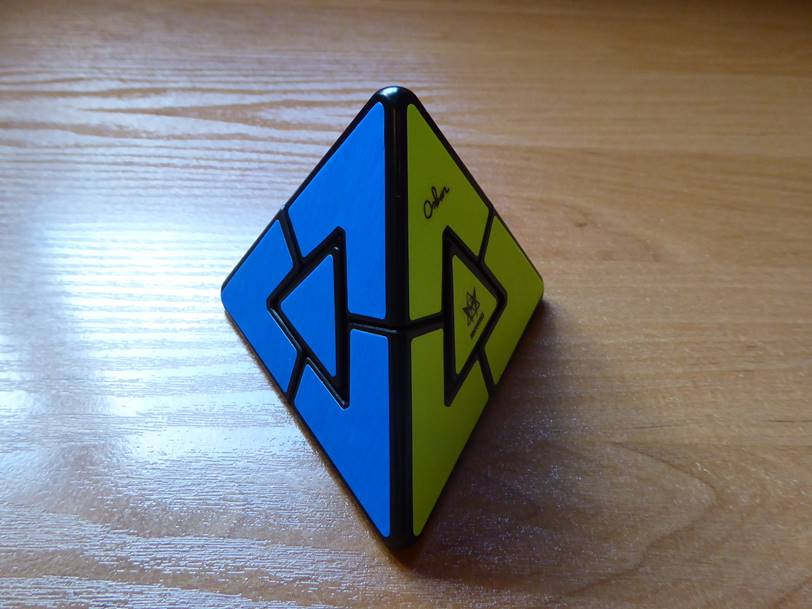
The Pyraminx Duo in its solved state.

The Pyraminx Duo (originally known as Rob's Pyraminx) is a tetrahedral twisty puzzle in the style of the Rubik's Cube. It was suggested by Rob Stegmann, invented by Oskar van Deventer, and has now been mass-produced by Meffert's.

== Overview ==
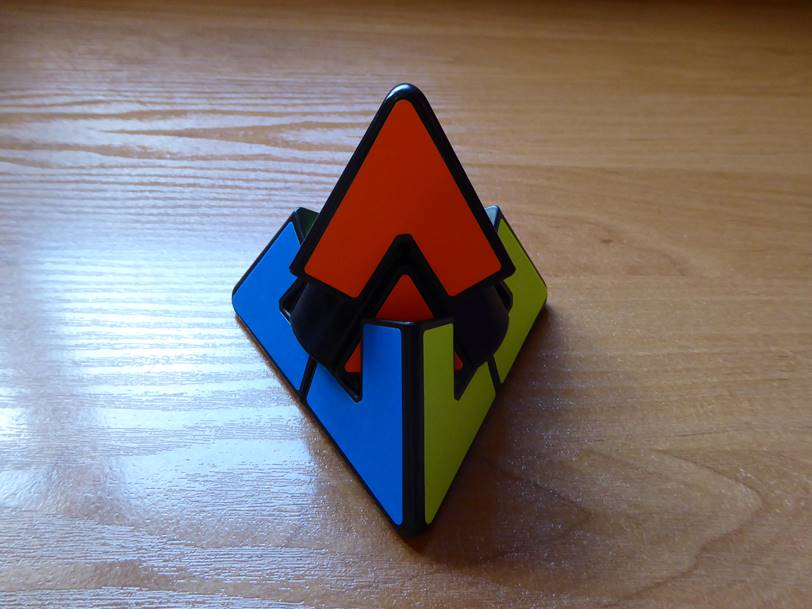
The Pyraminx Duo in the middle of a twist, showing how the puzzle can be scrambled.

The Pyraminx Duo is a puzzle in the shape of a tetrahedron, divided into 4 corner pieces and 4 face centre pieces. Each corner piece has three colours, while the centre pieces each have a single colour. Each face of the puzzle contains one face centre piece and three corner pieces.

The puzzle can be thought of as twisting around its corner pieces - each twist rotates one corner piece and permutates the three face centre pieces around it. An interesting feature is that the face centre pieces go "underneath" corner pieces during a twist.

The purpose of the puzzle is to scramble the colours, and then restore them to their original configuration of one colour per face.

Mechanically, the puzzle is similar to the Skewb, with all corner pieces of the Skewb visible (although shaped differently) and all centre pieces hidden.

== Number of combinations ==
There are 4 corner pieces. Each corner can be twisted in 3 different orientations, independently of the other corners. Therefore, the corners can be orientated in 3^{4} different ways. They cannot be permutated, therefore there is only one possible corner permutation.

There are 4 face centre pieces. These can be permutated in at most 4! different ways. However, the exact number of these permutations is not yet reached due to two constraints. The first constraint is that only even permutations of the face centers are possible (e.g. it is impossible to have only two face centre pieces swapped); this divides the limit by 2. The second constraint is that all centre permutations are dependent on the orientation of the corner pieces. Some permutations of centres are only possible when the total number of clockwise rotations of corner pieces is divisible by 3; other permutations are only possible when the total number of clockwise rotations is equivalent to 1 modulo 3; others are only possible when the number is equivalent to 2 modulo 3. This divides the limit by 3.

The face centre pieces have no obvious orientation, therefore this does not affect the total number of combinations.

The full number is therefore:

$$\frac{3^{4} \times 4!}{2 \times 3} = 324$$

This number, in relative terms, is extremely low compared to other puzzles like the Rubik's Cube (which has over 43 quintillion combinations), the Pocket Cube (with over 3.6 million combinations), or even the Pyraminx (with just over 930 thousand combinations, excluding rotations of the trivial tips).

== Optimal solutions ==
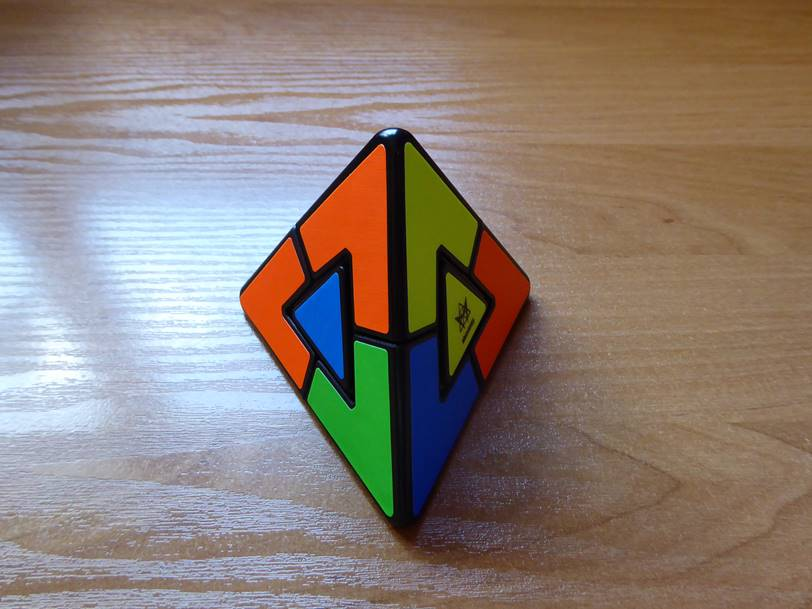
The Pyraminx Duo, scrambled.

As explained above, the total number of possible configurations of the Pyraminx Duo is 324, which is sufficiently small to allow a computer search for optimal solutions. The table below summarises the result of such a search, stating the number p of positions that require n twists to solve the Pyraminx Duo:

n	0	1	2	3	4	Total
p	1	8	48	188	79	324

The above table shows that the God's Number of the Pyraminx Duo is 4 (i.e. the puzzle is always at most 4 twists away from its solved state). Similarly to the total number of combinations, this number is very low compared to the Rubik's Cube (20), the Pocket Cube (11) or the Pyraminx (11, excluding the trivial tips).

== Solving ==
Due to its substantially low number of combinations and its low God's Number, the Pyraminx Duo is a relatively easy puzzle to solve; it has been described as "arguably the easiest non-trivial twisty puzzle". Because of this, cubers usually come up with their own methods of solving the puzzle. For an extra challenge, it is also not uncommon for cubers to invent their own "optimal" methods - i.e. methods that guarantee to solve the puzzle in no more than 4 moves.

== Variations ==
There are several variations of the Pyraminx Duo that have been invented. These variations all look the same as the original puzzle but use different colour schemes; usually these colour schemes make the orientations of the face centre pieces visible, which makes the puzzle slightly more challenging.

== See also ==
- Pyraminx
- Skewb
