= Rubik's Triamid =

1990 mechanical puzzle

The Rubik's Triamid is a mechanical puzzle invented by Ernő Rubik and released in 1990 by Matchbox. The puzzle was patented in Hungary in 1991. It was re-released in 2017 at the American International Toy Fair by Winning Moves.

The puzzle is similar to the Rubik's Cube in that the objective is to manipulate the puzzle until all sides are uniform in colour. The puzzle itself forms a triangular pyramid, so that there are four sides and colours.

== Rules ==
The Triamid is made of ten individual pieces (each with four coloured sides) and four joining sections. The user is able to manipulate the puzzle by removing a small pyramid (of four pieces) from any of the four end points, rotate it, and reattach it. The puzzle is solved when each side of the pyramid has a single colour.

The puzzle is superficially similar to the Pyraminx but, unlike that puzzle, it is possible to move pieces between a side and a corner position.

== Pieces ==
Each piece of the puzzle has four faces. Of the ten pieces:

- six pieces have two colours, and
- four pieces have three colours (that is, they have only one colour repeated).

In the solved state, the four pieces with three colours must lie on the end points of the pyramid.
