= Skewb =

Puzzle

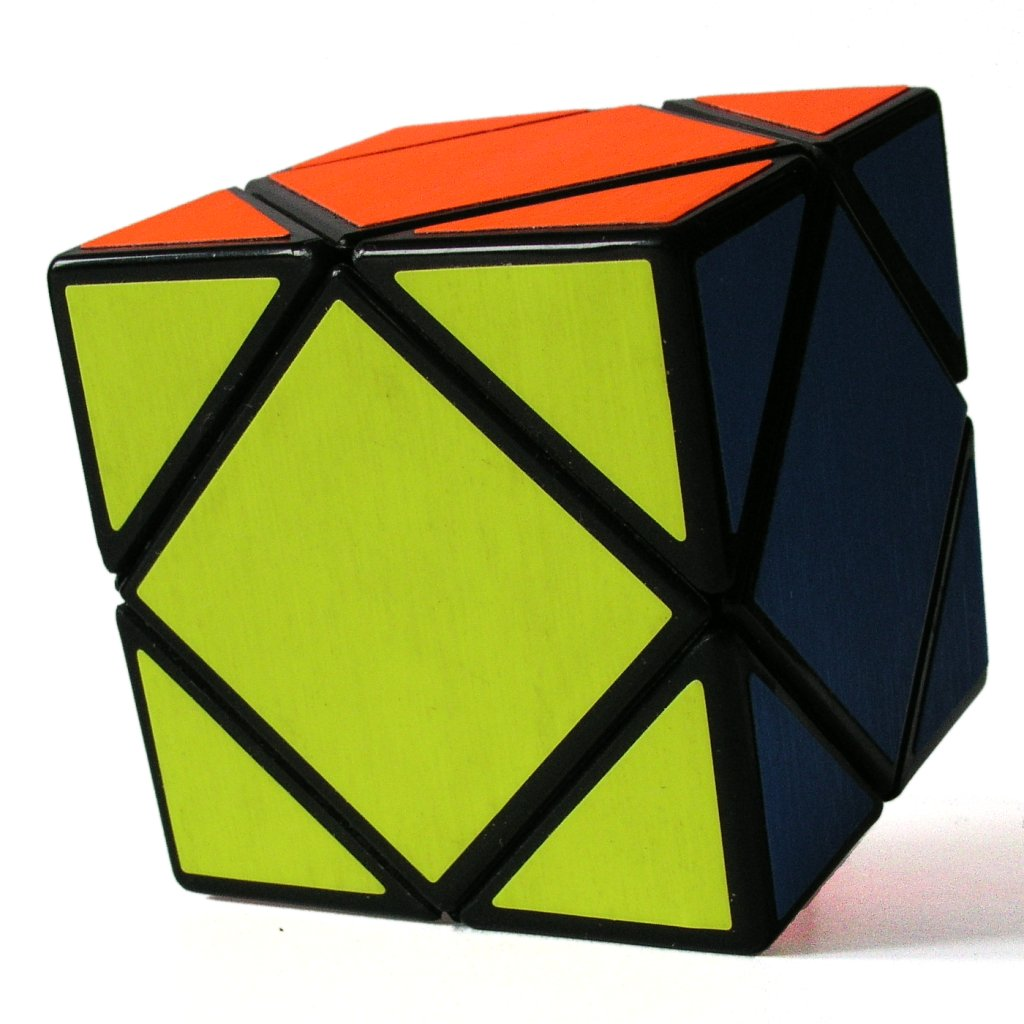
The Skewb in solved state

The four turning planes of the Skewb bisect it as shown in this figure.

The Skewb (/ˈskjuːb/) is a combination puzzle and a mechanical puzzle similar to the Rubik's Cube. It was invented by Tony Durham and marketed by Uwe Mèffert. Although it is cubical, it differs from the typical cubes' construction; its axes of rotation pass through the corners of the cube, rather than the centers of the faces. There are four axes, one for each space diagonal of the cube. As a result, it is a deep-cut puzzle in which each twist affects all six faces.

Mèffert's original name for this puzzle was the Pyraminx Cube, to emphasize that it was part of a series including his first tetrahedral puzzle, the Pyraminx. The name Skewb was coined by Douglas Hofstadter in his Metamagical Themas column. Mèffert liked the new name enough to apply it to the Pyraminx Cube, and he also named some of his other puzzles after it, such as the Skewb Diamond.

In December 2013, the Skewb was recognized as an official World Cube Association competition event.

== Mechanism ==
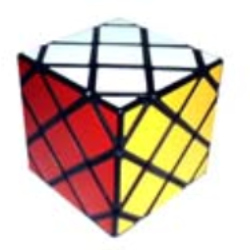
The Master Skewb, a variant of the Skewb

The Skewb's pieces are divided into subgroups and have several constraints. The eight corners are split into two groups—the four corners attached to the central four-armed spider and the four "floating" corners that can be removed from the mechanism easily. These corners cannot be interchanged i.e. in a single group of four corners, their relative positions are unchanged. A floating corner can be distinguished by squishing down when applying pressure to the corner. The centers only have two possible orientations, seen by scrambling a Skewb-like puzzle where the center orientation is visible (such as the Skewb Diamond or Skewb Ultimate), or by disassembling the puzzle.

== Records ==
The world record for single solve is 0.73 seconds, set by Vojtěch Grohmann of the Czech Republic at Głuszyca Open 2026.

The world record for average of 5 solves (excluding fastest and slowest) is 1.37 seconds, set by Ignacy Samselski of Poland at Cube Factory League Justynów 2025, with times of 1.22, 1.43, (1.16), 1.46, and (2.93) seconds.

=== Top 10 solvers by single solve ===
Rank	Name	Result	Competition
1	(Czech Republic) Vojtěch Grohmann	0.73s	(Poland) Głuszyca Open 2026
2	(United States) Carter Kucala	0.75s	(United States) Going Fast in Grandview 2024
3	(Spain) Alex Rosado Saez de Langarica	0.80s	(Spain) Tafalla Open 2026
4	(United States) Zayn Khanani	0.81s	(Canada) Rubik's WCA North American Championship 2022
5	(India) Divij Yadav	0.83s	(India) BITS Pilani Cube Open 2025
6	(Poland) Tomasz Pietruszka	0.84s	(Poland) Polish Championship 2025
7	(United States) Simon Kellum	0.85s	(United States) Going Fast in Grandview 2024
8	(United States) Brayden Wroten	0.86s	(United States) Oredigger Open CO 2025
8	(China) Kaixi Guo (郭铠希)	0.86s	(China) Guangzhou Special 2026
10	(Poland) Szymon Brągiel	0.87s	(Poland) Żory Open 2025
10	(Poland) Szymon Brągiel	0.87s	(Poland) Polish Championship 2025

=== Top 10 solvers by Olympic average of 5 solves ===
Rank	Name	Result	Competition	Times
1	(Poland) Ignacy Samselski	1.37s	(Poland) Cube Factory League Justynów 2025	1.22, 1.43, (1.16), 1.46, (2.93)
2	(Czech Republic) Vojtěch Grohmann	1.40s	(Czech Republic) Czech Championship 2026	1.36, (3.74), (1.14), 1.58, 1.26
3	(Poland) Oskar Hanuszkiewicz	1.51s	(Poland) Cube Factory League Kalisz 2026	(1.18), 1.61, 1.22, 1.71, (2.66)
4	(United States) Carter Kucala	1.52s	(United States) CubingUSA Heartland Championship 2024	1.65, 1.45, (2.57), (1.37), 1.45
4	(United States) Carter Kucala	1.52s	(United States) Machesney Park Spring 2026	1.75, 1.32, (2.59), (1.28), 1.50
4	(China) Kaixi Guo (郭铠希)	1.52s	(China) Xi'an Summer 2026	1.52, 1.85, (1.08), (DNF), 1.18
5	(United States) Dominic Redisi	1.53s	(United States) Rubik’s WCA North American Championship 2024	(2.05), 1.63, 1.43, 1.52, (1.07)
7	(Spain) Alex Rosado Saez de Langarica	1.54s	(Spain) Sarriguren Open 2025	(0.95), 1.24, (2.32), 1.75, 1.64
8	(United States) Zayn Khanani	1.56s	(United States) Pretzel Mania 2022	1.30, (1.20), 1.79, 1.60, (4.89)
8	(United States) Dean Jacob Adamo Susskind	1.56s	(United States) Bay Area Speedcubin' 69 2026	1.30, (1.18), 1.82, (2.03), 1.56
10	(United Kingdom) Ariel Benchetrit	1.57s	(United Kingdom) Wiltshire Spring 2026	1.56, 1.56, (2.41), (1.41), 1.59

== See also ==
- Dino Cube
- Dogic
- Megaminx
- Pocket Cube
- Professor's Cube
- Pyraminx Duo
- Pyraminx
- Rubik's Revenge
- Speedcubing
- V-Cube 6
- V-Cube 7
- V-Cube 8
