= Pyraminx =

Variant of Rubik's Cube

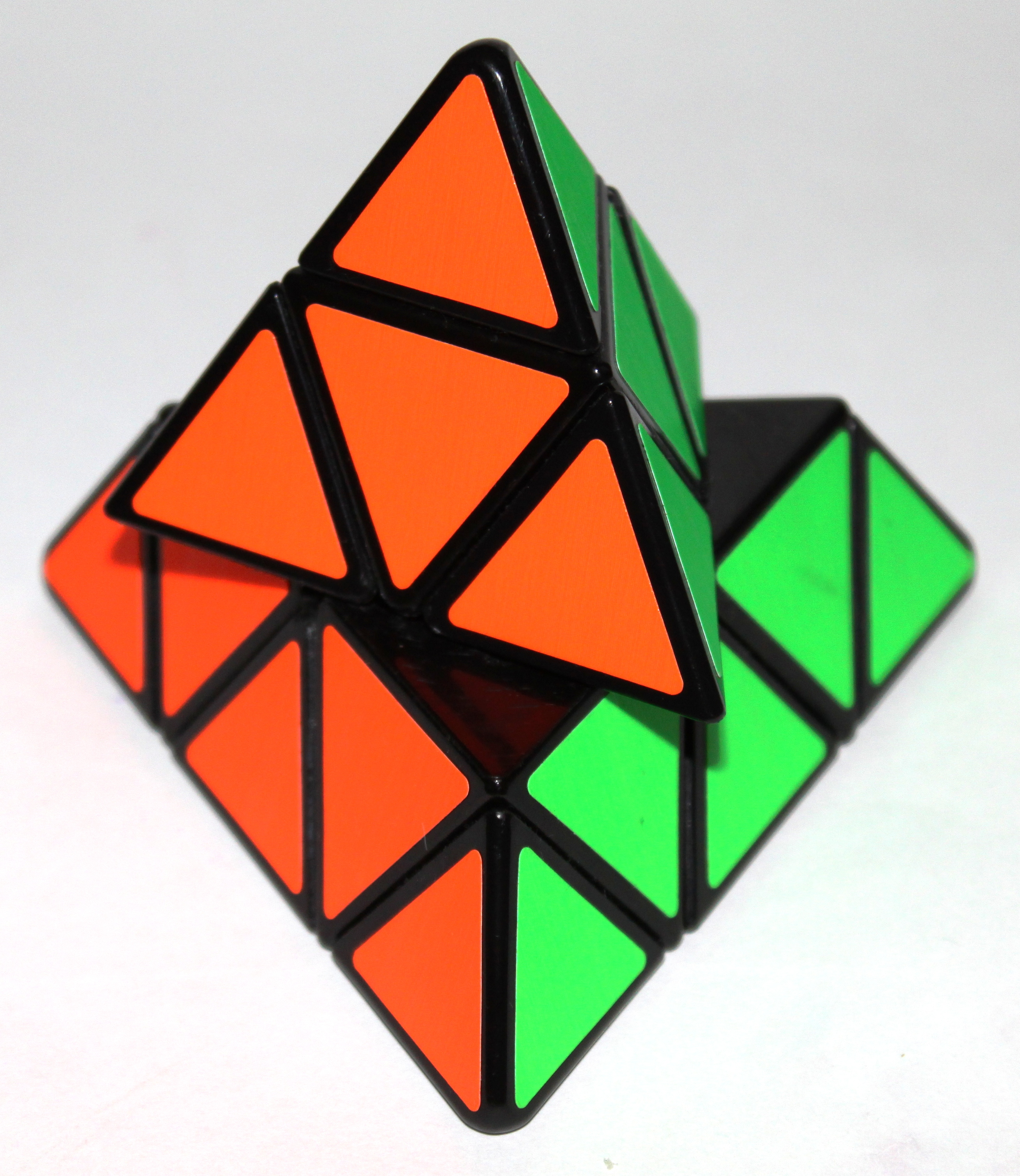
A Pyraminx slightly turned from the solved position

The Pyraminx (/ˈpɪrəmɪŋks/) is a regular tetrahedron puzzle in the style of Rubik's Cube. It was made and patented by Uwe Mèffert after the original 3 layered Rubik's Cube by Ernő Rubik, and introduced by Tomy Toys of Japan (then the 3rd largest toy company in the world) in 1981.

== Optimal solutions ==
The maximum number of twists required to solve the Pyraminx is 11. There are 933,120 different positions (disregarding the trivial rotation of the tips), a number that is sufficiently small to allow a computer search for optimal solutions. The table below summarizes the result of such a search, stating the number p of positions that require n twists to solve the Pyraminx:

n	0	1	2	3	4	5	6	7	8	9	10	11
p	1	8	48	288	1728	9896	51808	220111	480467	166276	2457	32

== Records ==
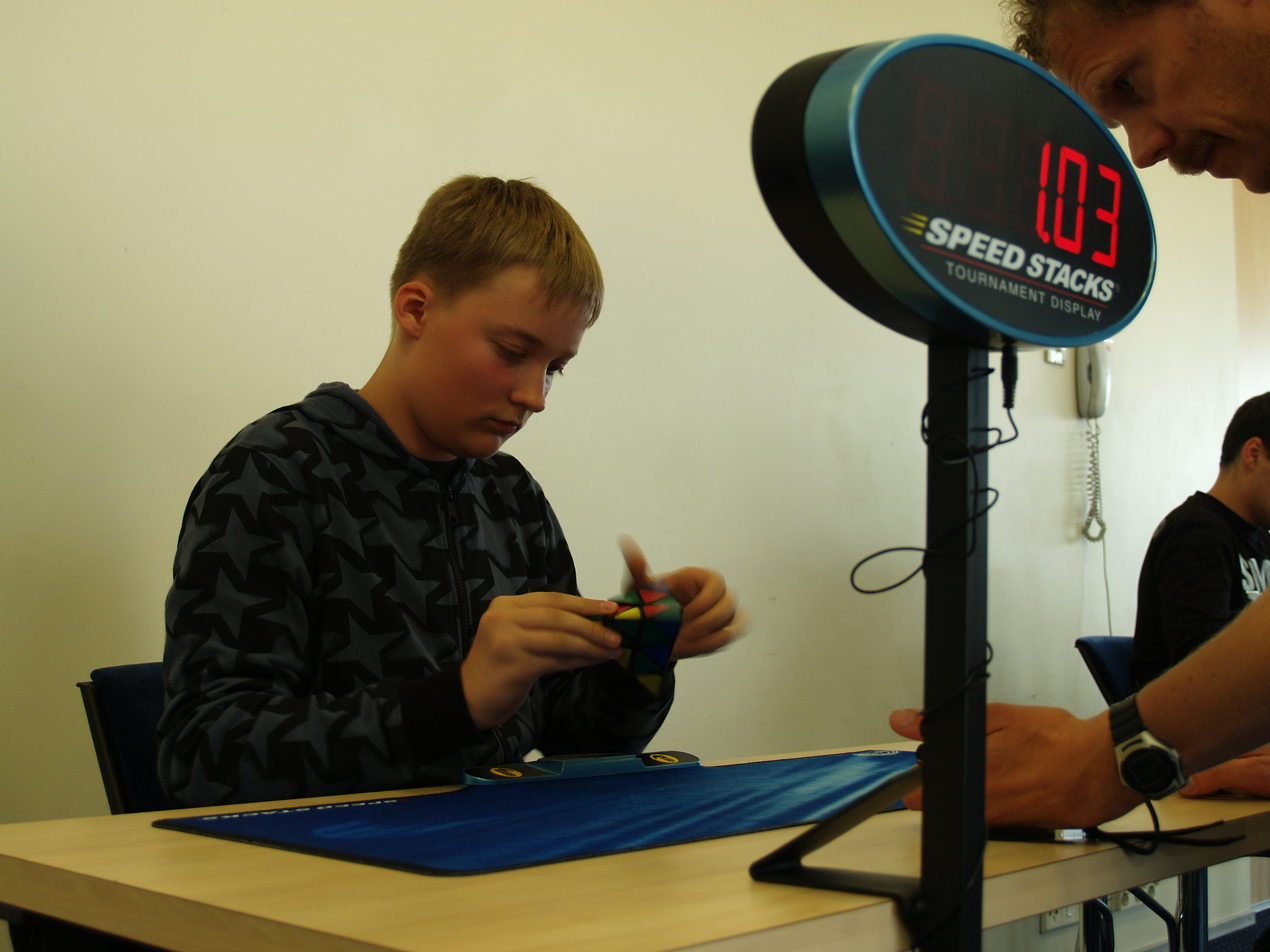
Andreas Pung solving a Pyraminx at a competition

The world record single solve is 0.70 seconds, set by Clem Tucker of the United States at Dobbs Ferry Decathlon 2026. The world record average of five solves (excluding fastest and slowest) is 1.14 seconds, set by Lingkun Jiang (姜凌坤) of China at Zhengzhou Zest 2025.

=== Top 10 solvers by single solve ===
Rank	Name	Result	Competition
1	(United States) Clem Tucker	0.70s	(United States) Dobbs Ferry Decathlon 2026
2	(United States) Simon Kellum	0.73s	(United States) Middleton Meetup Thursday 2023
3	(United States) Elijah Brown	0.75s	(United States) Berkeley Winter A 2023
4	(United States) Tucker Chamberlain	0.77s	(United States) Georgetown Side Events 2025
5	(Malaysia) Ng Jia Quan (黄佳铨)	0.78s	Singapore Small and Sides Feb 2025
6	(United States) Jeriyah Griffin	0.79s	(United States) Ohio State Madness 2026
6	(China) Lingkun Jiang (姜凌坤)	0.79s	(China) Guangzhou Grand Open 2026
8	(Singapore) Jovan Lee	0.80s	Singapore Small and Sides Feb 2025
8	(United States) Luke Garrett	0.80s	(United States) National Trail Open OH 2026
10	(New Zealand) Connor Johnson	0.82s	(New Zealand) Groundhog Day in Somerfield 2024

=== Top 10 solvers by Olympic average of 5 solves ===
Rank	Name	Result	Competition	Times
1	(China) Lingkun Jiang (姜凌坤)	1.14s	(China) Zhengzhou Zest 2025	1.04, (3.22), (0.97), 1.21, 1.16
2	(Australia) Sebastian Lee	1.15s	(Australia) Maitland Spring 2024	1.15, (1.53), 1.22, (1.01), 1.09
3	(New Zealand) Jasper Murray	1.27s	GAN New Zealand Nationals 2026	(0.96), 1.15, 1.34, (1.94), 1.33
4	(Spain) Aratz Larruzea	1.30s	(Spain) Gasteiz Open 2026	1.36, (0.98), 1.13, (2.63), 1.40
5	(United States) Jeriyah Griffin	1.38s	(United States) Ohio State Madness 2026	1.33, 1.41, (1.85), 1.40, (1.28)
6	(United States) Milan Vincent Andric	1.40s	(Netherlands) Rubik's WCA European Championship 2026	(1.12), 1.31, 1.55, (2.18), 1.34
7	(United States) Michael Nielsen	1.41s	(United States) Virginia Championship 2025	1.31, 1.35, 1.56, (1.15), (3.10)
8	(United States) Parker Trager	1.42s	(United States) Saint Mike's Cube Fest VT 2025	1.48, 1.39, 1.40, (1.69), (1.38)
8	(United States) Clem Tucker	1.42s	(United States) Mystic Cubikon 2026	(2.08), (1.20), 1.38, 1.54, 1.33
10	(New Zealand) Elyas Eyou	1.44s	New Zealand Cubing Decathlon 2026	(1.71), 1.40, 1.43, (1.10), 1.50
10	(India) Darshan Bhavanasi	1.44s	(United States) Kentucky Championship 2026	(2.27), (1.09), 1.78, 1.31, 1.22

== Methods ==
There are many methods for solving a Pyraminx. They can be split up into two main groups.

1) V First Methods - In these methods, two or three edges are solved first, and a set of algorithms called Last 3 Edges (L3E) or Last 4 Edges (L4E) are used to solve the remainder of the puzzle, depending on how advanced the specific method is.

2) Top First Methods - In these methods, three edges around a center piece are solved first, and the remainder of the puzzle is solved using a set of algorithms.

Common V first methods:

a) Layer by Layer - In this method, a face with all edges permuted is solved, and then the remaining puzzle is solved by a single algorithm from a set of 5.

b) Algorithmic L4E and Intuitive L4E - L4E (or Last 4 Edges) is somewhat similar to Layer by Layer. The only difference is that only two edges are solved around three centers. Both of these methods solve the last four edges in the same step, hence the name. The difference is that Intuitive L4E requires a lot of visualization and "intuition" to solve the last four edges while algorithmic L4E uses a set of algorithms. Algorithmic L4E is generally used more at higher levels, although there are very fast Intuitive L4E users. It is also easy to transition between Intuitive L4E and Algorithmic L4E.

Common top first methods:

a) One Flip - This method uses two edges around one center solved and the third edge flipped. There are a total of six cases after this step, for which algorithms are memorized and executed. The third step involves using a common set of algorithms for all top first methods, also called Keyhole last layer, which involves 5 algorithms, four of them being the mirrors of each other.

b) Keyhole - This method uses two edges in the right place around one center, and the third edge placed elsewhere on the puzzle. The centers of the fourth color are then solved using the slot formed by the non-permuted edge. The last step is solved using Keyhole last layer algorithms.

c) OKA - In this method, one edge is oriented around two edges in the wrong place, but one of the edges that is in the wrong place belongs to the block itself. The last edge is found on the bottom layer, and a very simple algorithm is executed to get it in the right place, followed by keyhole last layer algorithms.

Some other common top first methods are WO and Nutella.

Many top Pyraminx speedsolvers only use V-first methods, as top-first methods are extremely clunky and outdated due to hardware.

== Variations ==
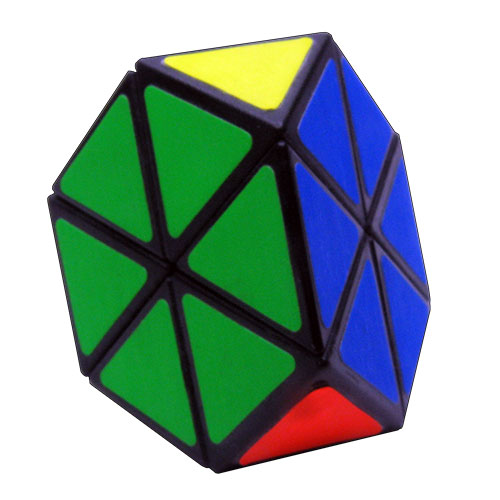
A solved Tetraminx.

There are several variations of the puzzle. The simplest, Tetraminx, is equivalent to the (3x) Pyraminx but without the tips (see photo), resembling a truncated tetrahedron. There also exist "higher-order" versions, such as the 4x Master Pyraminx (see photos) and the 5x Professor's Pyraminx.

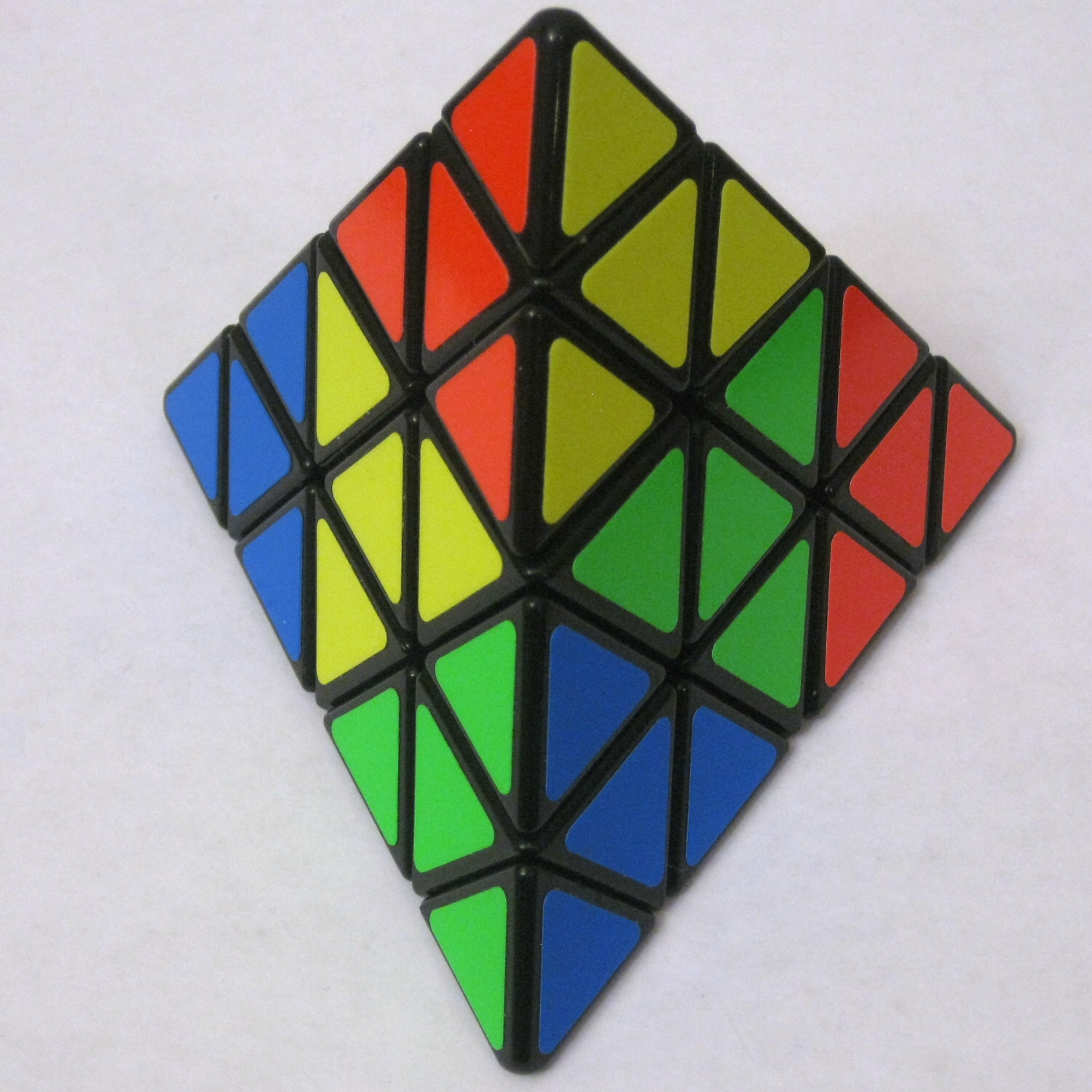
A basic pattern on a Master Pyraminx

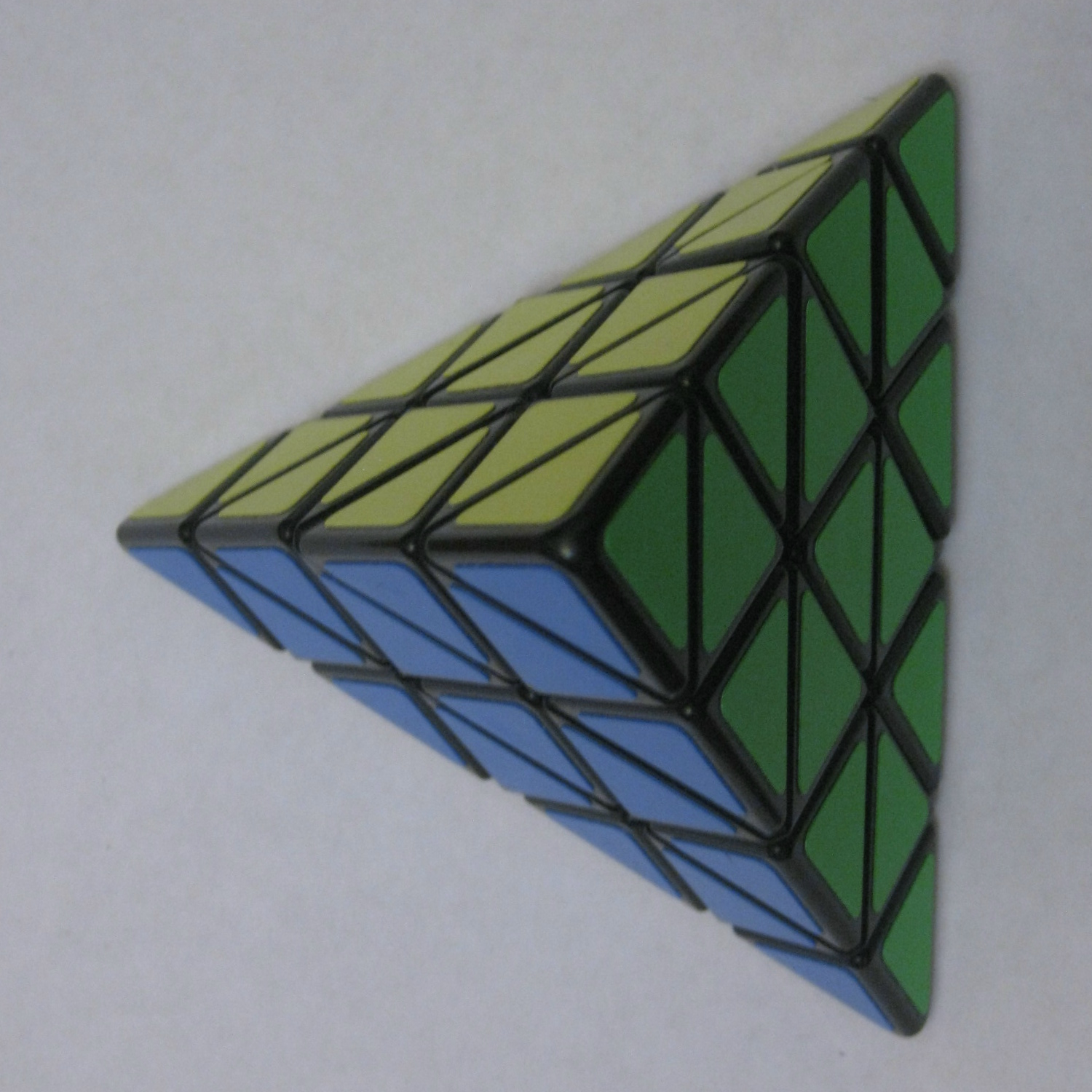
A solved Master Pyraminx

The Master Pyraminx has 4 layers and 16 triangles-per-face (compared to 3 layers and 9 triangles-per-face of the original), and is based on the Skewb Diamond mechanism. This version has about 2.6817 × 10^{15} combinations. The Master Pyraminx has

- 4 "tips" (same as the original Pyraminx)
- 4 "middle axials" (same as the original Pyraminx)
- 4 "centers" (similar to Rubik's Cube, none in the original Pyraminx)
- 6 "inner edges" (similar to Rubik's Cube, none in the original Pyraminx)
- 12 "outer edges" (2-times more than the 6 of the original Pyraminx)

In summary, the Master Pyraminx has 30 "manipulable" pieces. However, like the original, 8 of the pieces (the tips and middle axials) are fixed in position (relative to each other) and can only be rotated in place. Also, the 4 centers are fixed in position and can only rotate (like the Rubik's Cube). So there are only 18 (30-8-4) "truly movable" pieces; since this is 10% fewer than the 20 "truly movable" pieces of the Rubik's Cube, it should be no surprise that the Master Pyraminx has about 10,000-times fewer combinations than a Rubik's Cube (43 quintillion in the short scale or 43 trilion in the long scale). The Master Pyraminx can be solved in numerous ways: one is layer by layer like the original one or reducing it to a Jing pyraminx.

== See also ==
- Pyraminx Duo
- Pyramorphix and Master Pyramorphix, two regular tetrahedron puzzles which resemble the Pyraminx but are mechanically very different from it
- Pocket Cube
- Rubik's Cube
- Rubik's Revenge
- Rubik's Triamid
- Professor's Cube
- V-Cube 6
- V-Cube 7
- V-Cube 8
- Skewb
- Skewb Diamond
- Megaminx
- Dogic
- Combination puzzles
- Tower Cube
