= Skewb Ultimate =

Twelve-sided combination puzzle

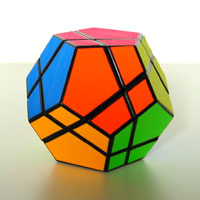
Meffert's version of the 6-color Skewb Ultimate

The Skewb Ultimate, originally marketed as the Pyraminx Ball, is a twelve-sided puzzle derivation of the Skewb, produced by German toy-maker Uwe Mèffert. Most versions of this puzzle are sold with six different colors of stickers attached, with opposite sides of the puzzle having the same color; however, some early versions of the puzzle have a full set of 12 colors.

== Description ==
The Skewb Ultimate is made in the shape of a dodecahedron, like the Megaminx, but cut differently. Each face is cut into four parts, two equal and two unequal. Each cut is a deep cut: it bisects the puzzle. This results in eight smaller corner pieces and six larger "edge" pieces.

The object of the puzzle is to scramble the colors, and then restore them to the original configuration.

== Solutions ==
At first glance, the Skewb Ultimate appears to be much more difficult to solve than the other Skewb puzzles, because of its uneven cuts which cause the pieces to move in a way that may seem irregular or strange.

Mathematically speaking, however, the Skewb Ultimate has exactly the same structure as the Skewb Diamond. The solution for the Skewb Diamond can be used to solve this puzzle, by identifying the Diamond's face pieces with the Ultimate's corner pieces, and the Diamond's corner pieces with the Ultimate's edge pieces. The only additional trick here is that the Ultimate's corner pieces (equivalent to the Diamond's face pieces) are sensitive to orientation, and so may require an additional algorithm for orienting them after being correctly placed.

Similarly, the Skewb Ultimate is mathematically identical to the Skewb, by identifying corners with corners, and the Skewb's face centers with the Ultimate's edges. The solution of the Skewb can be used directly to solve the Skewb Ultimate. The only addition is that the edge pieces of the Skewb Ultimate are sensitive to orientation, and may require an additional algorithm to orient them after being placed correctly.

== Number of combinations ==
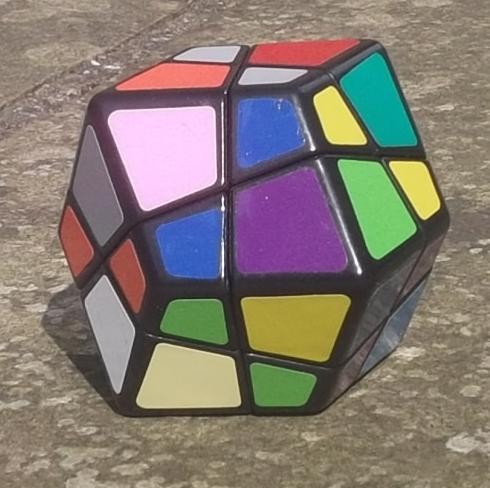
Rhombic dodecahedron version of the puzzle with equivalent mechanism

The Skewb Ultimate has six large "edge" pieces and eight smaller corner pieces. Only even permutations of the larger pieces are possible, giving 6!/2 possible arrangements. Each of them has two possible orientations, although the orientation of the last piece is determined by the orientations of the other pieces, hence giving a total of 2^{5} possible orientations.

The positions of four of the smaller corner pieces depend on the positions of the other four corner pieces, and only even permutations of these positions are possible. Hence the number of arrangements of corner pieces is 4!/2. Each corner piece has three possible orientations, although the orientation of the last corner is determined by the orientations of the other corners, so the number of possible corner orientations is 3^{7}. However, the orientations of four of the corners plus the position of one of the other corners determines the positions of the remaining three, so the total number of possible combinations of corners is only $\frac{4!\times 3^6}{2}$.

Therefore, the number of possible combinations is:

$$\frac{6!\times 2^5\times 4!\times 3^6}{4} = 100,776,960.$$

== See also ==
- Skewb Diamond
- Combination puzzles
- Mechanical puzzles
