= Oskar van Deventer =

Dutch puzzle maker (born 1965)

- Born: Mattijs Oskar van Deventer; 1965 (age 60–61); Wageningen, Netherlands
- Occupations: Puzzle maker, Senior Scientist at TNO
- Known for: Puzzle designer, inventor
- Title: Ph.D. in optics

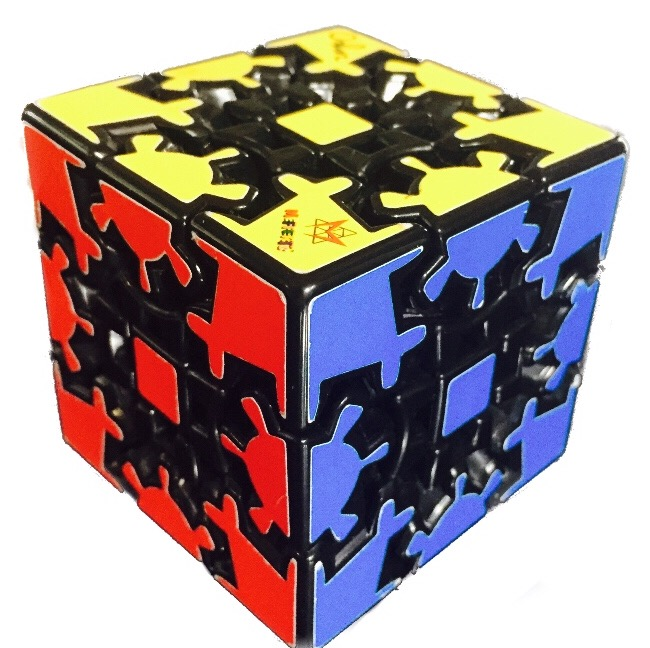
Gear cube

Oskar van Deventer (born 1965) is a Dutch puzzle maker. He prototypes puzzles using 3D printing. His work combines mathematics, physics, and design, and he collaborates at academic institutions. Many of his combination puzzles are in mass production by Uwe Mèffert and WitEden. Oskar van Deventer has also designed puzzles for Hanayama.

He was a Guinness World Record holder for his 17×17×17 "Over the Top Cube" Rubik's Cube-style puzzle from 2012 to 2016, when it was beaten by a 22×22×22 cube.

In addition to being a puzzle maker, Oskar is a research scientist in the area of media networking and holds a Ph.D. in optics. He has over 100 publications, over 80 patents applications, and hundreds of standardization contributions.

== Mass-produced puzzles ==
- Gear cube: Previously named "Caution Cube" because there was a big chance to pinch your fingers with the gears. It was mass-produced by Mèffert's in 2010, but over time it appeared as several copies and shape mods of the same design.
- Gear Cube Extreme: A bandaged version of the Gear cube, where 4 gears are replaced with 4 standard edges, making the puzzle harder. It was mass-produced by Mèffert's in 2010, and was also copied by other companies.
- Gear Shift: It was mass-produced by Mèffert's in 2011; a knock off version also appeared.
- David Gear Cube: Previously called "Polo cube" in reference to Alex Polonsky, who had the idea. It was mass-produced By Mèffert's in 2013.
- Geared Mixup: A variant of the gear cube where all faces can perform 90° rotations, allowing centers to be interchanged with edges, hence the term "mixup". It was mass-produced by Mèffert's in 2014.
- Geared 5×5×5: An unknown Chinese company mass-produced this puzzle in 2015 using a 3D printed sample, without the permission of Oskar. An agreement was met to please both sides.
- Gear Ball: A mass-produced spherical Gear cube made by Mèffert's.
- Mosaic cube: Previously called "Fadi cube", it is a corner turning puzzle with two cut depths similar to Okamoto and Greg's "Lattice Cube". It was mass-produced by Mèffert's in 2010.
- Planets puzzle: Four balls in a frame. Craters on the balls block and unblock movement on the adjacent balls.
- Rob's Pyraminx: It was mass-produced by Mèffert's in 2014.
- Rob's Octahedron: It was mass-produced by Mèffert's in 2015.
- Mixup Cube: a 3×3×3 Rubik's cube that can perform 45° rotations on the middle layers, allowing centers interchange with edges. It was mass-produced by WitEden.
- Treasure chest: A 3×3×3 puzzle that when solved, can be opened, revealing a small chamber inside. It was mass-produced by Mèffert's.
- Icosaix: A face turning icosahedron with jumbling movements. It was mass-produced by MF8 in 2015.
- Crazy Comet: Was mass-produced by LanLan without Oskar's permission in 2016 but a deal was achieved later.
- Redi Cube: A corner turning puzzle mass produced by Moyu in 2017.

== See also ==
- Bram Cohen
