= Skewb Diamond =

Octahedron-shaped combination puzzle

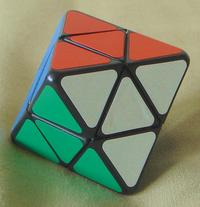
The Skewb Diamond

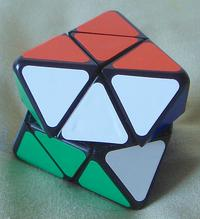
The Skewb Diamond, slightly twisted

The Skewb Diamond is an octahedron-shaped combination puzzle similar to the Rubik's Cube. It has 14 movable pieces which can be rearranged in a total of 138,240 possible combinations. This puzzle is the dual polyhedron of the Skewb. It was invented by Uwe Mèffert, a German puzzle inventor and designer.

== Description ==
The Skewb Diamond has 6 octahedral corner pieces and 8 triangular face centers. All pieces can move relative to each other. It is a deep-cut puzzle; its planes of rotation bisect it.

It is very closely related to the Skewb, and shares the same piece count and mechanism. However, the triangular "corners" present on the Skewb have no visible orientation on the Skewb Diamond, and the square "centers" gain a visible orientation on the Skewb Diamond. In other words, the corners on the Skewb are equivalent to the centers on the Skewb diamond. Combining pieces from the two can either give you an unscrambleable cuboctahedron or a compound of cube and octahedron with visible orientation on all pieces. The Skewb Ultimate is mathematically equivalent to the latter case, but is shaped as a dodecahedron with two cuts per face.

== Number of combinations ==
The purpose of the puzzle is to scramble its colors, and then restore it to its original solved state.

The puzzle has 6 corner pieces and 8 face centers. The positions of four of the face centers is completely determined by the positions of the other 4 face centers, and only even permutations of such positions are possible, so the number of arrangements of face centers is only 4!/2. Each face center has only a single orientation.

Only even permutations of the corner pieces are possible, so the number of possible arrangements of corner pieces is 6!/2. Each corner has two possible orientations (it is not possible to change their orientation by 90° without disassembling the puzzle), but the orientation of the last corner is determined by the other 5. Hence, the number of possible corner orientations is 2^{5}.

Hence, the number of possible combinations is:

$$\frac{4!\times 6!\times 2^5}{4} = 138,240.$$

== See also ==
- Skewb
- Skewb Ultimate
- Face Turning Octahedron, an octahedron puzzle that would result if middle layers were added to the Skewb Diamond
