= List of shipwrecks before Anno Domini =

The list of shipwrecks before Anno Domini includes some ships sunk, wrecked or otherwise lost before the year AD 1 of the Gregorian calendar.

== Before 20th century BC ==
Year	Origin	Name	Type	Location	Notes
3455 BC — 3400 BC	Swifterbant	Bergschenhoek Shipwreck	Dugout canoe	Bergschenhoek, Netherlands	
2700 - 2400 BC	Eastern Mediterranean coast	Kekova shipwreck	Trade vessel	The shore of Kekova Island in Antalya, Turkey.	
2700–2200 BC	Argolid	Dokos shipwreck	Small merchant vessel	Coast of southern Greece near the island of Dokos	

== 20th–10th century BC ==
Year	Origin	Name	Type	Location	Notes
c. 1300 BC	Canaanite	Canaanite shipwreck	merchant vessel	90 kilometres (56 mi) off Israel in the Mediterranean Sea	Wreck is located at a depth of 1,800 metres (5,900 ft).
1300 BC	Canaan	Uluburun shipwreck	Deep-sea merchant vessel	Southeast of Kaş, Turkey	
1200 BC	Canaan	Cape Gelidonya shipwreck	Coastal merchant vessel	Cape Gelidonya	
1200–1000 BC	Istrian	Zambratija shipwreck	Sewn boat	Bay of Zambratija near Umag	

== 7th century BC ==
Year	Origin	Name	Type	Location	Notes
unknown	Phoenician	Gozo Phoenician shipwreck	deep-sea merchant vessel	Off Malta	
600 BC	Phoenician	Bajo de la Campana Phoenician shipwreck	Trade ship	Off Murcia, Spain	
650–600 BC	Phoenician	Phoenician shipwrecks of Mazarrón	Coastal merchant vessels	Off Mazarrón, Spain	

== 6th century BC ==
Year	Origin	Name	Type	Location	Notes
~600 BC	Etruria	Giglio Island shipwreck	Coastal merchant vessel	Giglio Island, Italy	

== 5th century BC ==
Year	Origin	Name	Type	Location	Notes
~400 BC	Phoenician	Ma'agan Mikha'el shipwreck	Coastal merchant vessel	Kibbutz Ma'agan Michael, Israel	
450–425 BC	Erythrae	Tektas wreck	Coastal merchant vessel	Turkey	

== 4th century BC ==
Year	Origin	Name	Type	Location	Notes
unknown		unknown		Mediterranean on the Eratosthenes Seamount	Found by the Ocean Exploration Trust's vessel EV Nautilus.
unknown		unknown		Porticello	
unknown	Greek	unknown	Merchant ship	Black Sea, off the coast of Bulgaria	Rudder, rowing benches, and hold still intact.

== 3rd century BC ==
Year	Origin	Name	Type	Location	Notes
c. 294 BC	Greek	Kyrenia	Merchant ship	Kyrenia, Cyprus	
241 BC	Punic	Marsala Punic ships		Sicily	

== 2nd century BC ==
Year	Origin	Name	Type	Location	Notes
Late 2nd century BC		unknown	Warship	Thonis	Sunk by debris falling from a temple that collapsed during an earthquake.

== 1st century BC ==
Year	Origin	Name	Type	Location	Notes
80 BC		Mahdia shipwreck			
86 BC		Antikythera wreck			
