= Buporthmus =

Ancient promontory in Greece

Buporthmus (Ancient Greek: Βούπορθμος) was the name of a steep promontory in Argolis that extended into the sea near Hermione (Argolis). There was a temple dedicated to Demeter and Persephone, as well as another to Athena Promachorma (meaning "Champion of the Anchorage"). It was probably between the modern Cape Muzaki and Dokos island.
