= Zambratija shipwreck =

Bronze Age shipwreck in the Mediterranean Sea

Coordinates: 45°28′31.59″N 13°30′14.47″E

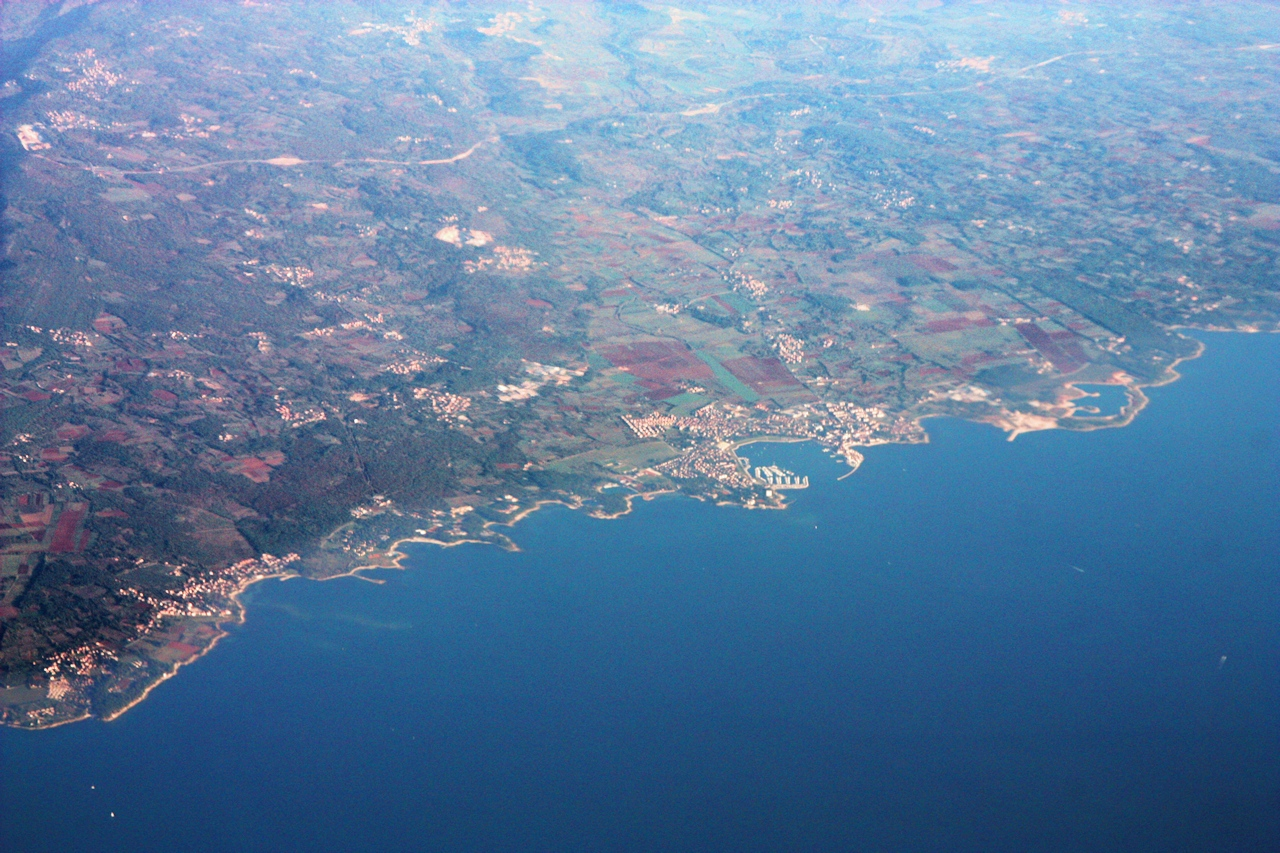
View of upper Istrian coast, Croatia with Zambratija on the left (north) and Umag to the right

The Zambratija shipwreck is a Late Bronze Age shipwreck dated to the 12th to 10th century BCE discovered in the Bay of Zambratija near Umag on Croatia's Istrian peninsula in the Mediterranean Sea.

Signs of the wreck were first spotted by a fisherman in 2008, about 150 meters from shore. The vessel is the oldest sewn boat in the Mediterranean, and was sewn together with rope made from plant fiber, and is believed to have been a mastless boat with up to nine oarsmen.

Nautical archaeologist Ida Koncani Uhač of the Archaeological Museum of Istria dated the boat to the late 12th to late 10th century BCE, in the transition from the Late Bronze to the Iron Age, and said that it is "the prototype of all 64 sewn boats discovered in the Mediterranean". The first investigations were by marine archaeologist Giulia Boetto in 2014 from France's CNRS, which collaborated with the Croatian team on the project.

The preserved remains are 6.7 by 1.6 metres (22.0 ft × 5.2 ft), reconstructed to 9 m (30 ft). The keel piece is elm, varying in width from 3 to 20 centimetres (1 to 8 in) towards one end. The strakes, also of elm, and are sewn together, with irregular stitching diagonal to the plank edges and pegs locking the stitches in. Thin laths of fir with vegetal wadding were placed over the seams before sewing, along with pitch for waterproofing.

== See also ==
- Wreck of Rochelongue
- Cape Gelidonya shipwreck
- Canaanite shipwreck
- List of shipwrecks
- List of surviving ancient ships
- Uluburun shipwreck

== Works cited ==
- AFP (January 12, 2024). "Oldest hand-sewn boat in the Med has been saved from oblivion in Croatia". Times of Malta.
- Pomey, Patrice; Boetto, Giulia (2019). "Ancient Mediterranean Sewn‐Boat Traditions" (PDF). International Journal of Nautical Archaeology. 48 (1). Taylor & Francis: 5–51. doi:10.1111/1095-9270.12337. ISSN 1057-2414.
- Radley, Dario (20 January 2024). "Oldest hand-sewn boat in the Mediterranean prepares for next journey". Archaeology News.
- Weinman, Steve (15 June 2023). "Divers set to lift Bronze Age 'sewn' boat". DiverNet.
