= Canaanite shipwreck =

Bronze Age shipwreck in the Mediterranean Sea

A Canaanite shipwreck dating from the Late Bronze Age was found in the eastern Mediterranean Sea in June 2024, 90 km (56 mi) off the shoreline of Israel. The wreck site consists of hundreds of storage jars while the structure of the ship itself have yet to be found.

According to the Israel Antiquities Authority (IAA), the ship belonged to ancient Canaanite merchants and was the oldest shipwreck to be discovered in deep water as of June 2024. Two jars were retrieved and dated to 1300 BCE. As of June 2024, there were plans to exhibit the jars in the National Campus for the Archaeology of Israel in Jerusalem. The rest of the cargo has been left undisturbed.

== Discovery ==
The cargo of a Canaanite merchant vessel was discovered in 2023, about 90 km (56 mi) off the Israeli shoreline at a depth of 1.8 km (1.1 mi), when natural gas production company Energean was scanning the seabed of the Mediterranean Sea next to Israel's proposed Katlan natural gas field with an underwater robot to find and produce natural gas. During the scan, a cluster of urns was observed, which led them to contact the IAA. The discovered urns were hundreds of complete Canaanite amphoras dating to 1300 BCE.

After alerting the IAA regarding the seafloor anomaly, the conducted survey discovered evidence of a 3,300-year-old shipwreck on the seabed. The IAA said that it was about 12 to 14 meters (39 to 46 feet) long. It may have been crewed by four to six sailors. Unless it had lost its way, the shipwreck's location indicated capabilities in deep-sea navigation. It was the earliest shipwreck ever discovered in deep sea water in the world. Following the survey, the IAA designed and dispatched a specially equipped robot to examine and retrieve samples from the ship's cargo of hundreds of jars. The samples taken consisted of two large jars dating to the Bronze Age. The ship itself has been not been found above the sea bed, but timbers may have survived below the cargo. The IAA announced the discovery in June 2024. As of the announcement, there were plans to exhibit the two jars recovered from the site in the National Campus for the Archaeology of Israel in Jerusalem.

== Analysis ==
According to the IAA, the shipwreck changed the understanding of marine navigation in ancient times. Up to its discovery, it had been thought that marine routes around the Mediterranean were based on sailing along the coast. Yaakov Sharvit, director of the Maritime Archeology Unit at the Antiquities Authority, says: "the discovery shows the impressive navigational abilities of the ancients – the kind that made it possible to cross the Mediterranean Sea without any eye contact with the shore – since from this distance you can only see the horizon line around. Most likely, the navigation was done using the heavenly bodies – with the help of calculating the angles of the sun and the stars." As of June 2024, the reason why the ship sank was not known, but speculations included an attack by pirates, a storm, and a leak in the ship.

== See also ==
- Dokos shipwreck – 2700–2000 BC Greek shipwreck
- Uluburun shipwreck – 14th-century BCE Mediterranean shipwreck
