= Zambratija =

Zambratija Zambrattia
- Village
- Location within Croatia
- Coordinates: 45°28′26″N 13°30′36″E
- Country: Croatia
- County: Istria County
- Municipality: Umag

Area
  - Total: 1.7 sq mi (4.5 km^{2})

Population (2021)
  - Total: 438
  - Density: 250/sq mi (97/km^{2})
- Time zone: UTC+1 (CET)
  - Summer (DST): UTC+2 (CEST)
- Postal code: 52470 Umag
- Area code: 052

Zambratija (Italian: Zambrattia) is a village in Umag municipality in Istria County, Croatia.

== Geography ==
The Zambratija bay has a tidal islet, Šipar, with an elevation of -1 m below sea level.

== History ==
In 2008, a sunken boat was discovered 200 meters offshore, and later investigation revealed that it was a Late Bronze Age boat, named the Zambratija shipwreck. It is the earliest known example of sewn boat hull construction technique in the Mediterranean.

== Demographics ==
According to the 2021 census, its population was 438. It was 443 in 2001.

== Bibliography ==
- Drenovec, Franček (December 2012). "Hrvatski jadranski otoci, otočići i hridi" (PDF). Hrvatski otoci (in Serbo-Croatian).
