= Saronic Islands =

Island group in Greece

Coordinates: 37.8°N 23.5°E

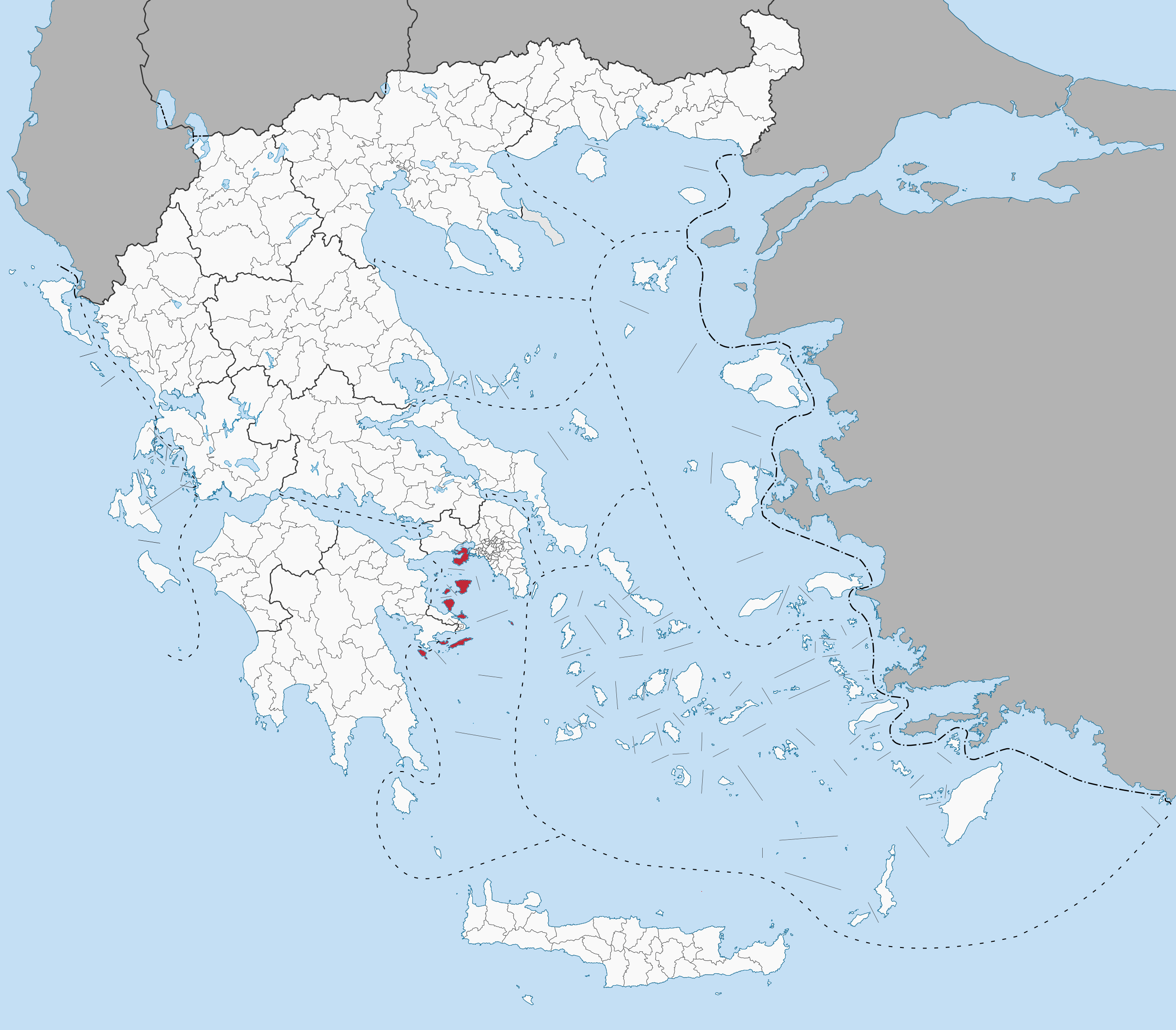

The Saronic Islands or Argo-Saronic Islands is an archipelago in Greece, named after the Saronic Gulf in which they are located, just off the Greek mainland. The main inhabited islands of this group are Salamis, Aegina, Agistri, and Poros. The islands of Hydra and Dokos, which lie off the northeast tip of the Peloponnese (technically between the Saronic Gulf and the Argolic Gulf), are sometimes included as part of the Saronic Islands.

The Saronics belong to the Greek administration of Attica.

Many mainland Greeks have vacation homes in the Saronic Islands, which are regularly served by ferries from the Athen's port of Piraeus and the Peloponnese. Salamis, the largest island of the group, is where the ancient Greek navy defeated the Persians in the Battle of Salamis in 480 BC.

== Main islands ==
Island	Area (Km^{2})	Population (2011)
Salamina	96	39,283
Aegina	83	13,056
Hydra	50	1,948
Poros	23	3,951
Spetses	22	3,934
Agistri	13	1,142
Dokos	12.5	18

== See also ==
- List of islands of Greece
