= Dokos =

Island near Hydra, Greece

Native name: Δοκός
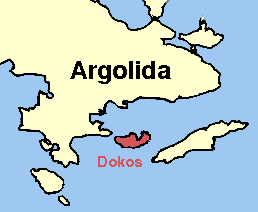
- Dokos island
- Interactive map of Dokos

Geography
- Coordinates: 37°19′59.21″N 23°19′16.82″E
- Archipelago: Saronic Islands
- Area: 13.537 km^{2} (5.227 sq mi)

Administration
- Greece
- Region: Attica
- Regional unit: Islands

Demographics
- Population: 18 (2011)
- Pop. density: 1.3/km^{2} (3.4/sq mi)

Dokos (Greek: Δοκός) is a small Greek island of the Argo-Saronic Gulf, adjacent to Hydra, and separated from the Peloponnese by a narrow strait called, on some maps, "the Hydra Gulf." It is part of the municipality of Ýdra (Hydra) in Islands regional unit and reported a population of 18 persons at the 2011 census. The island is populated only by some Orthodox monks and perennial sheep herders. The island is rocky, reaching a height of 308 metres (1,010 ft). During ancient times it was called Aperopia (Ἀπεροπία).

== Archaeology ==
It has, since the ancient years, considered to be a strategic location. On the east side lie the ruins of a great Byzantine - Venetian Castle. During the Middle Ages, the island served as a refuge for Albanian settlers' animals.

Dokos, according to archaeological studies, has been inhabited since the early Bronze Age. In 1975, Peter Throckmorton discovered a wreck near Dokos that has been dated to about 2150 BC, and may be the oldest shipwreck known.

== Historical population ==
Year	Population
1991	8
2001	43
2011	18
2021	???
