= Dokos shipwreck =

2700–2000 BC Greek shipwreck

The Dokos shipwreck is the second-oldest known shipwreck in the world, according to archeologists. The wreck has been dated to the second Proto-Helladic period, 2700–2200 BC.

The remains of the shipwreck are located about 15–30 metres (50–100 ft) underwater off the coast of southern Greece near the island of Dokos (ancient name Aperopia) in the Aegean Sea. Dokos is about 100 kilometres (60 mi) east of Sparta, Peloponnese.

The ship itself is long gone, as everything biodegradable has been dissolved by the sea. The only surviving evidence of the shipwreck is a cargo site of hundreds of clay vases and other ceramic items that were carried aboard the ship. These four-thousand-year-old remains were discovered by American archeologist Peter Throckmorton on August 23, 1975.

The Dokos wreck site was extensively excavated between 1989 and 1992 by the Hellenic Institute of Marine Archaeology (HIMA). Archaeologist Dr. George Papathanasopoulos, President of HIMA, conducted the first ever full-scale excavation in Greece of an ancient shipwreck. Due to the irregularity of the seabed, a new system, the Sonic High Accuracy Ranging and Positioning System (SHARPS), was used to plot and map the underwater finds. Additional surveys were conducted and speculation that the remains dated to the Early Helladic period was confirmed.

== Evidence ==
According to HIMA, the Cycladic pottery evidence is dated to around 2200 BC, which makes the Dokos wreck the second oldest known underwater shipwreck yet discovered. The clay pots appear to be merchandise from an ancient Argolida manufacturing facility. It is presumed that these were intended for trade to small coastal villages around the Gulf of Argos and the Myrtoan Sea. The cargo site consists of one of the largest collections of Early Helladic II pottery known. This Helladic pottery technology developed before the invention of the pottery wheel.

The pottery consisted of hundreds of ceramic pieces including cups, kitchenware, and urns. Over 500 clay vases were uncovered, dating to the Early Helladic period. There were a variety of sauceboats in multiple shapes and sizes. The bowls and sauceboats of the Early Helladic period were the most common types found in southern and central Greece. After further inspection of the sauceboats, it has been suggested that these types resemble those from Askitario in Attica, and are also comparable to ones in Lerna and from the Cyclades. This evidence shows that the shipwreck may lie on the maritime trade route from South Euboea to the Saronic and Argolid gulfs. There were many amphorae found, as well as basins, wide-mouthed jars, braziers, baking trays, askoi, pithoi, and common household utensils.

Stone anchors were also found 40 meters from the wreck. The anchors consisted of two large boulders with holes bored in them, which likely would have been dropped before the ship sank. Lead ingots used for trade were also found. The merchant ship had a wide variety of tableware and it is speculated that it traded all over the region.

During the 1989 to 1992 HIMA excavation, the site produced more than 15,000 pottery sherds and artifacts. They also found many millstones at the site, which are speculated to have been part of the ship's cargo or possibly used as ballast. These artifacts and items were raised from the sea floor and transported to the Spetses Museum, where they will be studied and placed into conservation.

== Sources ==
- Anastasi, P. "Aegean Sea Floor Yields Clues to Early Greek Traders." The New York Times, January 2, 1989.
- Anzovin, Steven et al. Famous First Facts (International Edition), H. W. Wilson Company, 2000, ISBN 0-8242-0958-3
- Enalia Annual 1990, Vol 2 (publ. 1992). HIMA, Athens
- Wachsmann, Shelley. Seagoing Ships & Seamanship in the Bronze Age Levant. College Station: Texas A&M University Press, 1998. Web
