= Peter Throckmorton =

American photojournalist and a pioneer underwater archaeologist (1928–1990)

- Born: Edgerton Alvord Throckmorton; July 30, 1928; New York City, New York
- Died: June 5, 1990 (aged 61); Newcastle, Maine
- Spouse(s): Joan Henley; Catherine Gates
- Children: Lucy, Paula; Mark Potok, step-son, Sarah Potok, step-daughter
- Scientific career
- Fields: journalist; underwater archaeologist
- Workplaces: Nova Southeastern University

Edgerton Alvord Throckmorton (July 30, 1928 – June 5, 1990), known as Peter Throckmorton, was an American photojournalist and a pioneer underwater archaeologist.

He is best remembered for fusing academia, archaeometry, and diving in 1960 to create responsible underwater archaeology: the excavation of the Cape Gelidonya bronze age wreck site. The team he assembled worked under the auspices of the University of Pennsylvania. The project would launch the career of marine archaeologist George Bass.

Throckmorton was a founding member of the Sea Research Society and served on its Board of Advisors until his death in 1990. He was also a trustee for NUMA and was an instructor at Nova Southeastern University.

== Discoveries ==
- The Cape Gelidonya shipwreck (c. 1200 BC) was discovered near the eponymous Cape Gelidonya, Turkey by Throckmorton in 1959 using information provided him in Bodrum, Turkey, by Kemal Aras, a sponge diver. Aras had first seen parts of the vessel's cargo of bronze ingots in 1954, but had failed to recognize that it was actually a Bronze Age shipwreck and thus its archaeological importance. The ship is believed to have been Syrian or Phoenician. The team members of the first season in 1960 excavated under a permit issued to University of Pennsylvania: Throckmorton, George Bass and wife Anne, Claude Duthuit, Honor Frost, Frederic Dumas and Joan du Plat Taylor. He negotiated with the Turkish Government to turn an abandoned castle into the Bodrum Museum of Underwater Archeology.
- The Yassi Ada shipwreck (c. 4th century AD) was discovered in a fully-silted ancient Roman harbor at Yassi Ada, Turkey, by Peter Throckmorton and Honor Frost in 1958, but was not fully surveyed and excavated until 1967–69.
- The Pantano Longarini wreck (c. 600-650 AD), found by Peter Throckmorton and Gerhard Kapitän at Pantano Longarini, Sicily, Italy in 1965, is of Greek or Southern Italian origin. The report in International Journal of Nautical Archaeology (Nautical Archaeology Society) was co-authored with his wife, Joan Throckmorton.
- The Dokos shipwreck (c. 2250-2050 BC) was discovered near Hydra Island, Greece, in 1975 by Peter Throckmorton who found cargo from a sunken ship site at 20 meters depth. The cargo consisted of pottery of the Cycladic type. This is possibly the oldest wreck discovered to date.
- The Elissa, the 1877 Aberdeen-built iron bark was discovered by Throckmorton in 1975 as she lay off the shipbreaker's yard in Perama, Greece. From her lines and fittings and his experience sailing aboard a 'Downeaster' as a teenager, he knew Elissa for what she was – one of the last square-rig ships still in the trade, even if greatly modified, of smuggling cigarettes. His efforts, combined with those of the San Francisco Maritime Museum's founder Karl Kortum, saved the ship until she could find a safe haven with the Galveston Historical Society. She is now completely restored and considered one of the finest nineteenth-century tall ships still sailing.

== Publications ==
- The Sea Remembers: Shipwrecks and Archaeology from Homer's Greece to the Rediscovery of the Titanic, ed. Peter Throckmorton (New York: Smithmark Publishers, 1987) ISBN 1555840930 Library of Congress: 87-14273
- Oldest Known Shipwreck Yields Bronze Age Cargo. by Peter Throckmorton, National Geographic 121.5 (May 1962): 696-71
- The Lost Ships: An Adventure in Underwater Archaeology. by Peter Throckmorton, Boston and Toronto, 1964. ISBN 0864380445
- The economics of treasure hunting with real life comparisons, by Peter Throckmorton, 1990
- Surveying in Archaeology, by Peter Throckmorton (Aris & Phillips Ltd - Jan 1, 1969) ISBN 0-85668-063-X ISBN 978-0856680632
- Diving for Treasure, by Peter Throckmorton, published simultaneously by The Viking Press, New York City, and Penguin Books Canada Limited (1977) ISBN 0670274496 Library of Congress: 77-6689
- History from the Sea, edited by Peter Throckmorton, ISBN 0864380445
- Shipwrecks and Archaeology: The Unharvested Sea, published simultaneously by Little, Brown and Company, Boston, and Little, Brown & Company (Canada) Limited, Toronto (1970), Library of Congress: 76-79373

== Personal life ==
He was born in 1928 in New York City to parents Edgerton Alvord Throckmorton and Lucy Norton Leonard who divorced in the 1930s. He had attended the Groton School in Massachusetts and the Fountain Valley School of Colorado, Class of 1946, and registered for military service in Colorado on June 3, 1946. He used his GI Bill to go to the Musee de l'Homme in Paris.

He was fluent in French, Greek, and Turkish.

George Bass wrote of him:

"Born in New York, he eventually rebelled against his privileged background, running away from boarding school in Colorado to seek adventure. He worked on various vessels in the Pacific, finally reaching Hawaii, where he learned to dive. After four years in the army, in Japan and Korea, he enrolled in the University of Hawaii and worked on a terrestrial archaeological excavation. Although he never graduated from college, he also studied at the Musée de l'Homme in Paris."
