= Pithos =

Ancient Greek storage container

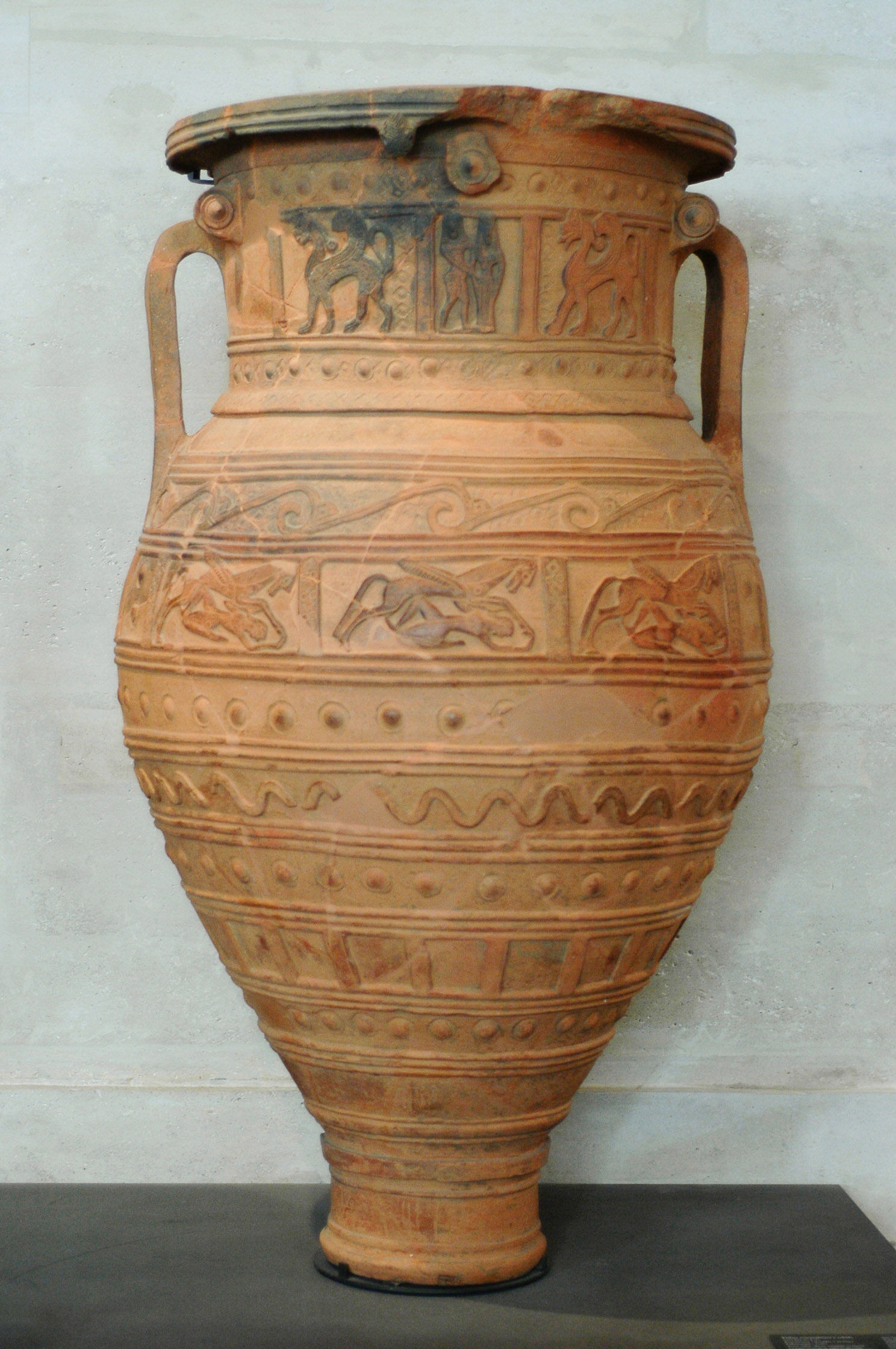
- Pithos from Iron-Age Crete. About 1.6 m tall. br>Below: Pithoi at Knossos. Placed out of the pits for viewing, the pithoi stood in the pits for access and stability.

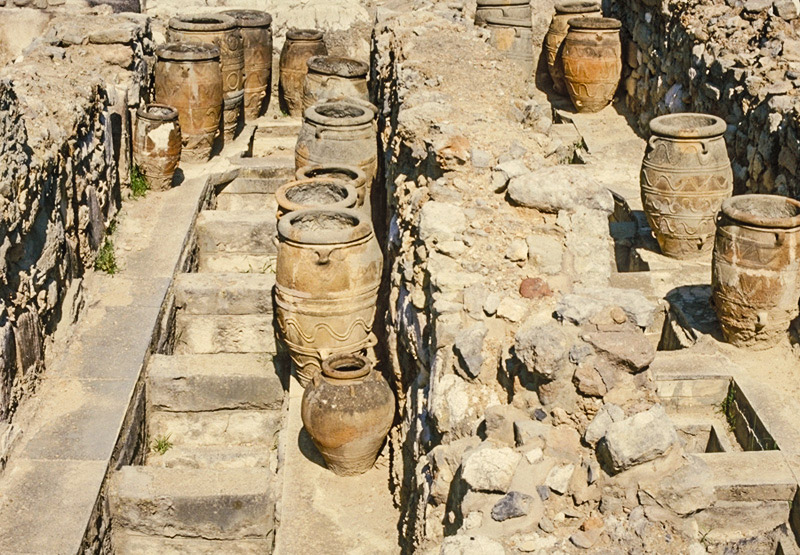
- Material: Ceramic
- Size: Approximately the size of a human, some larger, some smaller.
- Writing: Sometimes inscribed with an identifying mark.
- Created: Neolithic, Bronze Age, Iron Age
- Discovered: Most frequently at large administrative centers
- Present location: Circum-Mediterranean

Pithos (/ˈpɪθɒs/, Ancient Greek: πίθος, plural: pithoi πίθοι) is the Greek name of a large storage container. The term in English is applied to such containers used among the civilizations that bordered the Mediterranean Sea in the Neolithic, the Bronze Age and the succeeding Iron Age. Pithoi were used for bulk storage, primarily for fluids and grains; they were comparable to the drums, barrels and casks of recent times.The name was different in other languages; for instance, the Hittites used harsi-.

Secondarily, discarded pithoi found other uses. Like the ceramic bathtubs of some periods, the size of a pithos made it a convenient coffin. In Middle Helladic burials in Mycenae and Crete, sometimes the bones of the interred were placed in pithoi. The ancient Iberian culture of El Argar used pithoi for coffins in its B phase (1500–1300 BC).

The external shape and materials were approximately the same: a ceramic jar about as high as a man, a base for standing, sides nearly straight or generously curved, and a large mouth with a lid, sealed for shipping.

Jars of this size could not be handled by individuals, especially when full. Various numbers of handles, lugs, or some combination thereof, gave a purchase for some sort of harness used in lifting the jar with a crane.

Pithoi were manufactured and exported or imported over the entire Mediterranean. They were used most heavily in the Bronze Age palace economy for storing or shipping wine, olive oil, or various types of vegetable products for distribution to the populace served by the palace administration. Consequently, they became known to the modern public as pithoi when western classical archaeologists adopted the term to mean the jars uncovered by excavation of Minoan palaces on Crete and Mycenaean ones on mainland Greece.

The term has now been adopted into the English language as a general word for a storage jar from any culture. Along with this universality has come a problem of distinguishing the smaller pithoi from other types of pottery. Many ceramics are not any easily classifiable shape. If they were used for transportation or storage, they are likely to be called pithoi, even though they are not the size of the palace pithoi, and even though the forms might well have fit other types. Reconciliation of pre-classical pottery types with classical types has long been a problem of classical archaeology.

== Etymology ==
Pithos has two irreconcilable derivations, classical and Mycenaean. On the one hand, it was a well-used word of the Iron Age in Greece, dating to as early as the works of Homer. Julius Pokorny and other professional linguists developed a derivation from Proto-Indo-European *bhidh-, "container", that followed all the rules of language change and moreover was related to Latin fiscus, "purse", from which English obtains "fiscal". Regardless of the real derivation, a pithos certainly seems to be a large purse containing economic goods in quantity. The derivation would have been elegant, tracing fiscality back to prehistoric Greece, it was thought, taking its place with oikos, "house", the origin word for economic, and others. At that time Greek and Latin were believed to have had a common ancestor later than Proto-Indo-European.

Contemporaneously with Pokorny's epic dictionary, Linear B was first being deciphered, and various analyses were being put forward that Greek and Latin were not all that similar. There was no need to prove that developments in Latin were necessarily parallel to those in Greek. If bh- became f- in Latin, it would not necessarily do so in Greek.

The pithos was proposed to appear as 𐀤𐀵, qe-to, in the Bronze Age records of Pylos and Mycenae, denoted by Ideogram 203 𐃢, a small picture very similar to some Knossos pithoi, but which could just as well be matched by smaller pottery. Strangely enough it was not found at Knossos, a major find site of pithoi. It was duly transcribed as WINE JAR in Bennett's system, on the presumption that it would store primarily wine. According to the rules of reconstructing Mycenaean Greek from Linear B, qe-to must be a transcription of q^{u}ethos or q^{u}hethos, from a "base" of *g^{w}hedh-. The latter is similar to some Indo-European roots but has no meaningful connection to any. Ventris and Chadwick suggest that either qe-to was not a pithos, but was some smaller vessel, or that pithos is a foreign loan, like aryballos, lekythos, and some others. The Cretan pithos precedes by several hundred years any mentioned in Mycenaean Greek; moreover, many are inscribed with a line or two of Linear A. Perhaps pithos derives from a Linear A word. Ventris and Chadwick do not exclude fiscus from necessarily being related to pithos, they only point out that, if such is the derivation, the process is more complex than previously thought.

== Design ==
=== Storage ===
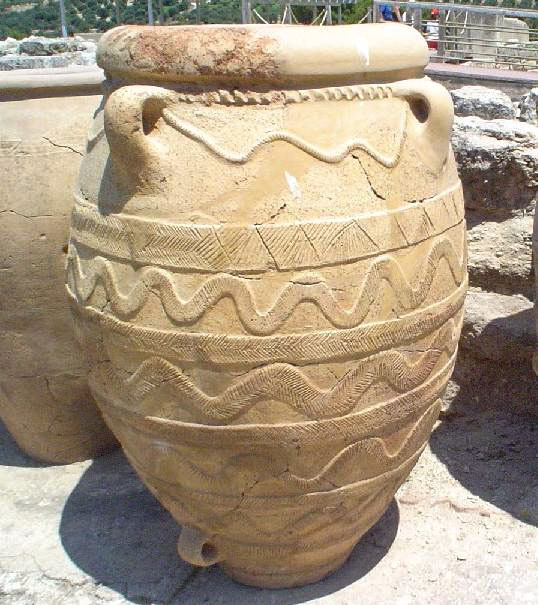
A smaller pithos, probably not semi-subterranean, as the decorative bands cover the entire body. There is a rope decoration around the neck; however, the body features distributed fasteners for handling via a rope harness.

A study done in 2003 by John Younger used a computer program, "vase", to calculate the maximum capacity of an LM I pithos, catalog number ZA Zb 3. The program required the drawing of a profile on the computer screen and the entry of a parameter—Younger used height—which in this case was 1.7 m (5.6 ft). "Vase" computed 996 liters, which is slightly too great, because it was based on external dimensions.

At the density of pure water, 1 kg per litre, the contents of a full pithos would weigh about a tonne. Moreover, the pithos selected was not among the largest. On similar studies of some other pithoi mentioned by Ventris and Chadwick, he obtained volumes such as 1430.5 liters, 1377.5 liters, 1334.7 liters, and so on, with full weights in excess of two tons. Dry goods would be much less dense, but even half the density, a weight of about a ton, is far beyond any handling operations by individuals, or teams of individuals, who could not obtain a purchase in sufficient numbers in the space around the jar to effect even a simple lift.

From the physical point of view, at least for these multi-ton pithoi, J. L. Stokes's view that they were "unmoveable furniture, being in general, either wholly or partially sunk in the ground", is most likely accurate. Currently at Knossos some empty pithoi have been placed standing in passageways, such as those of the storerooms. This is a convention of display. Apart from the fact that they would seriously have impeded the dimly-lit corridors, there would have been no way to access them except by scaffold. They must have been originally placed in the pits of the storerooms, except possibly for the smaller and more easily accessed ones. There is also a question of stability. Only some were of a stable barrel-shape.

If the large pithoi were sunk into the floor in the storage rooms, as the archaeological evidence indicates they were, their weight and bulk raise a question of how they were brought there. Handling of a full pithos except by extensive apparatus of tracks and cranes, of which there is no evidence, is unlikely. They were perhaps brought in empty, set in place, and then filled from smaller pithoi with some of the numerous bucket-type pottery.

=== Shipping ===
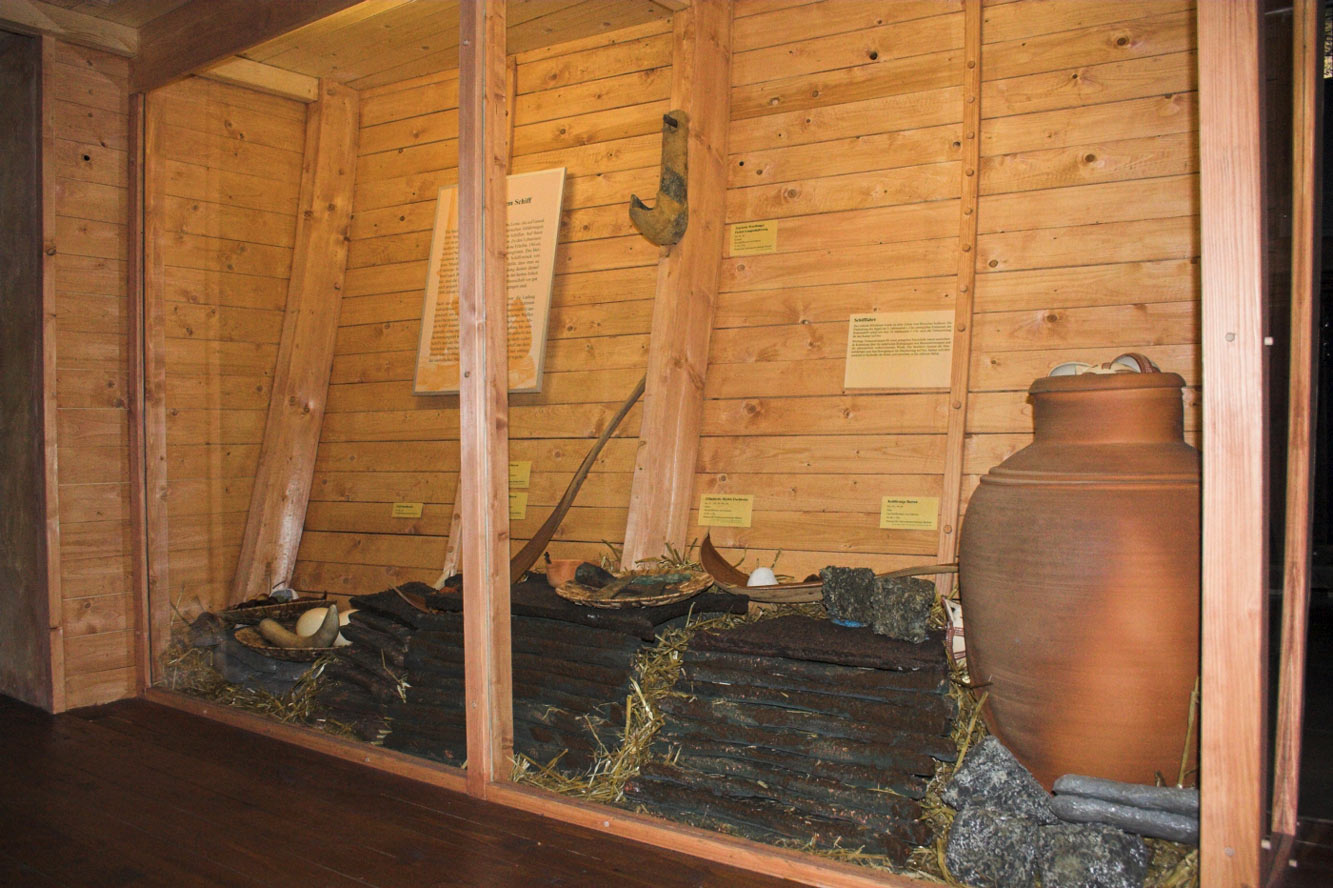
Uluburun ship pithos and other artifacts

The problem of handling large pithoi also raises questions of shipping. However, large pithoi are not found in the few shipwrecks of merchant vessels from the Bronze Age. In a recent study of the lading of the ship wrecked at Uluburun in the Late Bronze Age, Lin hypothesizes a cargo of about 20 tons, including 10 pithoi at 3.5 tons, or 0.35 tons each, if filled with fluid at about the density of water. The pithoi were not the chief cargo, which was 10 tons of copper ingots. The ship carried the load easily, with a draft of 1 m. The pithoi were comparatively light, with an estimated total mass of 2.7 tonnes. Not all contained liquid; a few were the first known packing crates, containing fine pottery. Fragments of lids were also found.

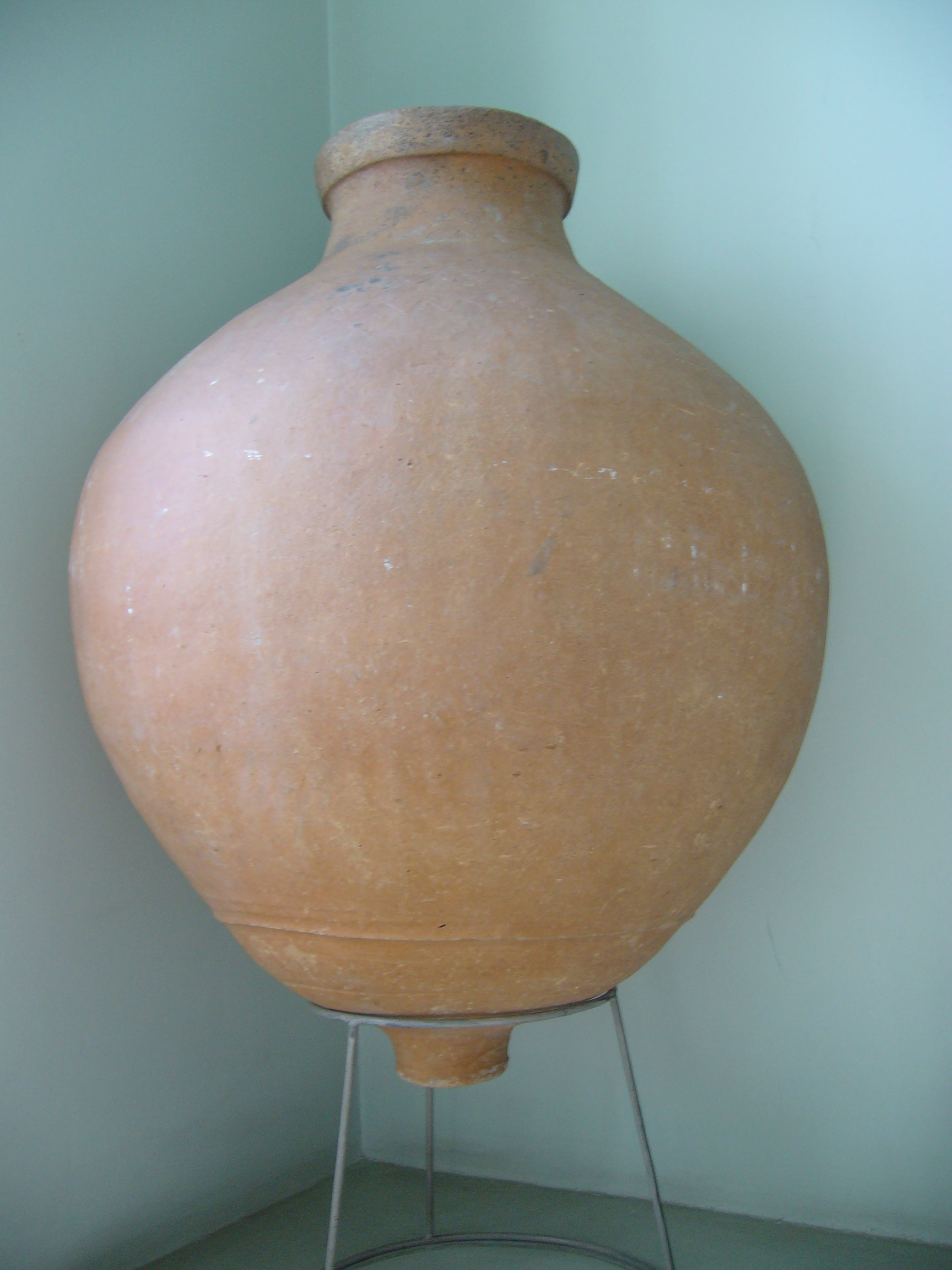
Marine pithos. Note the lug on the bottom for insertion into a rack built across the hold. The faint relief lines on the bottom are probably strengtheners. The mouth is small-diameter for easier sealing. A lip strengthens the rim.

Empty weights were obtained for all but two of the pithoi. Pithos KW 255 could be modelled to obtain an estimated volume of 293 liters at an empty weight of 120.25 kg, the highest of the eight. The lowest empty weight, that of KW 250, was 43 kg. Assuming a direct proportion between capacity and empty weight, the smallest capacity would have been about 105 litre. This approximate data from the wreck suggests that pithoi were in fact shipped, but only those of much smaller capacity. The pithoi of Uluburun, if full of liquid, would still have been too heavy for manual handling. Including the considerable weights of the containers, the total weights can be estimated at 150 to 420 kg. Equipment for hauling to the ship and lowering into the hold must have been used.

A Middle Bronze Age wreck of a small cargo ship off Sheytan Deresi (Devil's Creek), on the southwestern coast of Turkey, also was carrying pithoi, three "strap-handled" and four "handleless", of "ovoid-conical" form. The main cargo was those and other ceramics. The contents of the pithoi are not known. The handles are two parallel loops on either side of the mouth projecting slightly above it. The vases are now in the Bodrum Museum of Underwater Archaeology.

The dimensions of most of the pithoi are of the same order of magnitude. One has a height of 0.9 m and a body height of 0.84 m. The shapes are roughly similar to those of the large pithoi at Knossos, with smaller mouths relative to the body. The heights are approximately 50% of the heights at Knossos.

The dependency of the capacity on height was approximately given by Heron, a 1st-century engineer. He is credited with a number of formulae, all called "Heron's formula." As far as pottery is concerned, he divided pots into spheroid and pithoid, all the larger ones being the latter type, taking this classification from work done previously and appearing in the writings of Archimedes. The volume of a pithoid, which can be either a pithos or an amphora, is dependent, he asserts, on 11/14 of the product of the height and a number representing a squared average of minimum and maximum diameters.

There has been some controversy about what geometric figure this formula represents. The manuscript gives the square of the average of minimum and maximum diameters. Vodolazhskaya points out that if the average of the squares is used instead, the formula applies to a truncated paraboloid of revolution. She proposes that the manuscript was corrupted.

According to either version of Heron's formula, if height and diameter change proportionately, a change in height ought to result in a change in volume that is based on the cube of the percentage of change in height; that is, if the diameter doubles when the height doubles, then the resulting volume ought to be 8 times the previous volume, the cube of two.

Younger gives several heights of pots with associated volumes. The smallest listed with height is 40.6 liters at 48 cm high. If the height increases by a factor of 3.542 to 170 cm, the volume should increase by a factor of the cube of 3.542, or 44.438, which would be 1804 liters. The capacity of the 170 cm pot, however, is 996 liters, half the amount estimated using the cube, and that is generally true of the several pots for which Younger lists heights. An exponent of 2.53 estimates the increase in capacity, which means that, at least for these vases, the potters did not add to the diameter to keep the same proportion between diameter and height; the larger vases were made thinner.

If Younger's data can be taken as reflecting general truth, then the vases at Sheytan Deresi should have capacities that are greater than 40.6 liters by a factor of 1.875^{2.53}, or 4.91, where 1.875 is 90/48. The capacity is thus 4.91 x 40.6 = about 200 liters, or 440 pounds if water is the content. These pithoi also are too large for handling without equipment, and may even have required strengthening of the deck in the hold. Some sort of hold-fast scaffolding must have been designed to keep the cargo from shifting with disastrous results, except that a disaster did occur.

=== Weight and measures ===
All ancient civilizations had standards of weights and measures, which were used extensively in the distribution of goods. As is true today, the standards were set by law. Enforcement of them was a function of government. Pottery, as containers of the goods distributed, was designed to planned capacities for specific purposes, which is the reason why pottery is so useful in archaeology as indicators of period and why standard types can be detected at all.

All Bronze Age records of goods refer intentionally to the type, capacity and contents of ceramic storage and shipping vessels. Ventris and Chadwick devoted much of Documents in Mycenaean Greek to the topic of quantifiable measures. They and others were able to define a Mycenaean Greek dry unit of 96 liters and a wet unit of 36 liters.

John Younger calculated the number of Mycenaean wet and dry units (96.1 L and 28.8 L, resp.) in the capacities of 300 pots of known dimensions, including several storage pithoi. He attempted to assign the volumes to integer or half-integer multiples of these units.

== Decor ==
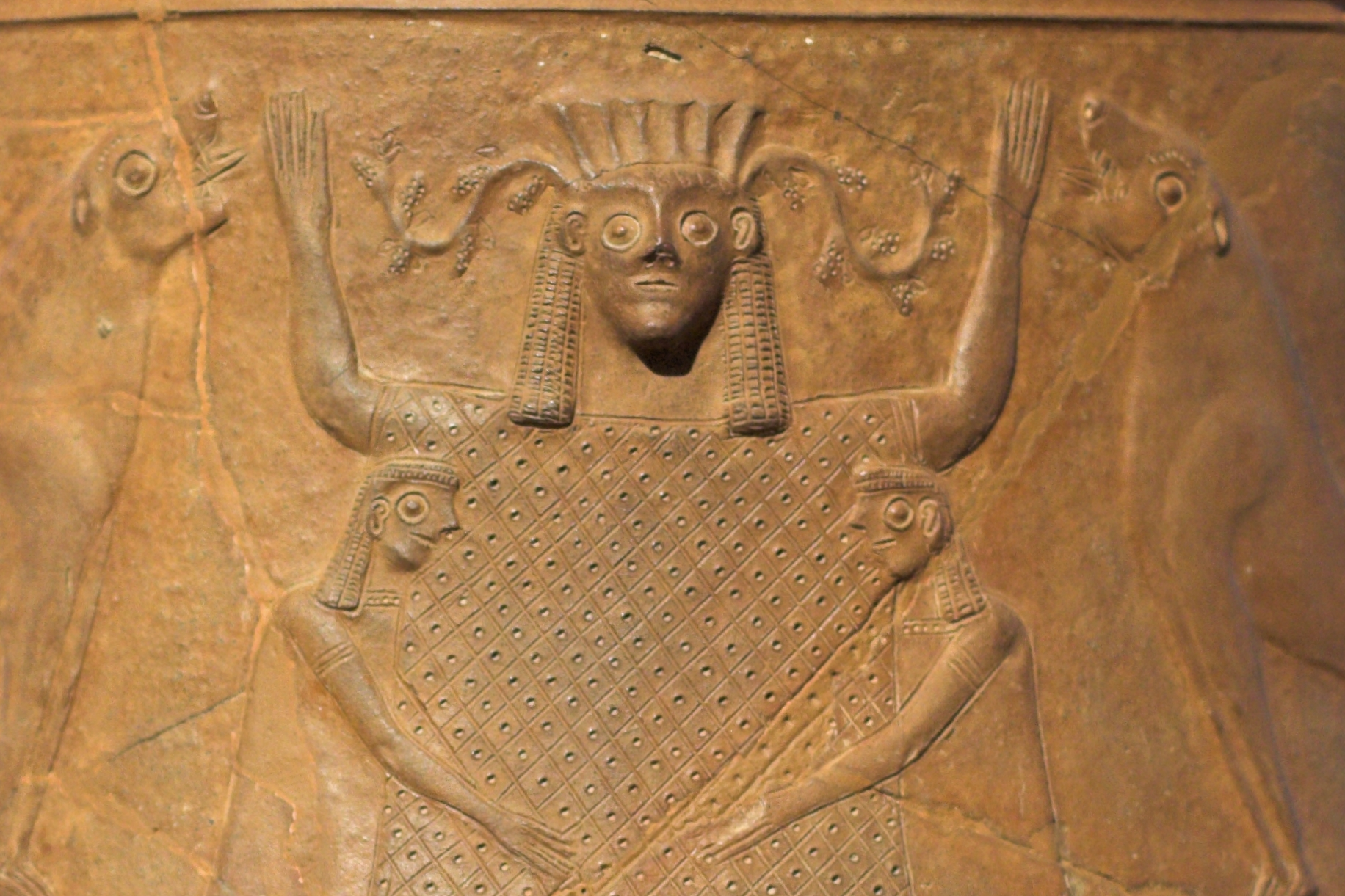
Pithos decorated with goddess identified with Potnia Theron by Greek authors

Some pithoi were used for rituals and even for burial. The decor of those pithoi differed significantly from ones used for transportation and storage in warehouses. Decorations would have been used to match the intended use.

Pithoi designed for marine transportation were generally not decorated. They must have been stored in a warehouse.

Storage pithoi, however, might be viewed in residential and administrative locations. The neck and shoulders were generally decorated, which is consistent with a partially subterranean location. All the large pithoi featured circumferential bands of thicker clay strengthening the joints where sections of the pithos were lowered onto each other and fused together.

The raised band concept was expanded over the upper body to a repeating circumferential pattern, incised or stamped at first, then rolled with a seal-like roller around the body of the pithos while it was still fresh clay. Some common themes are spirals, meanders, and waves. Waves in relief give the appearance of slack rope; whether they were intended to be that is debatable. Slack rope lifts nothing; moreover, a rope around the neck of the pithos for lifting would only concentrate the weight on the neck, probably shattering it. Multiple lugs, loops and handles indicate that for lifting purposes some sort of harness to distribute the weight must have been used. These rope-like waves of pattern, regardless of the potter's possible intent, have been termed "rope patterns" or "rope decoration", with a certain ambiguity of meaning as to whether actual rope was used to physically impress them, or they are merely intended to visually resemble rope.

If the pithos was small enough to stand in a conspicuous location, the bands were further divided into polychrome geometric patterns, such as a checkerboard or chevrons, or painted panel or band scenes, often in relief. These scenes are in no way inferior to those of other painted pots; in fact, the more extensive surfaces allowed more detail.

== See also ==
- Diogenes, who lived in a pithos
- Onggi
- Pandora's box (etymology)

== General and cited references ==
- Stokes, JL (1905–1906). "Pithos-fragments from Cameiros". The Annual of the British School at Athens. 12.
