= Uluburun shipwreck =

14th-century BCE Mediterranean shipwreck

Uluburun Late Bronze Age Shipwreck
- Uluburun is Turkish for "Grand Cape"
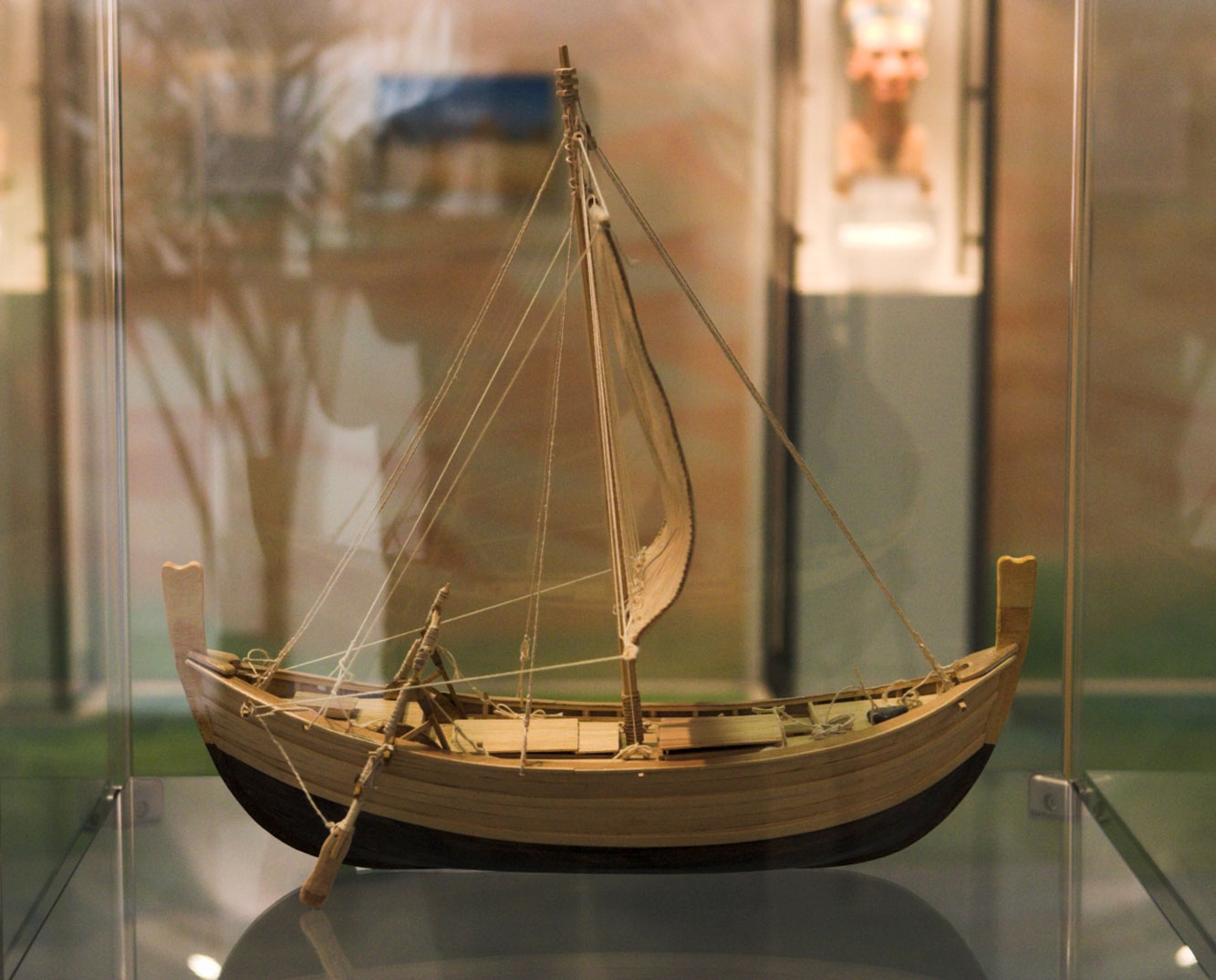
- Wooden model of the ship's reconstruction

- Site of the wreck 50 m (160 ft) off the eastern shore of Uluburun, and 6 mi (9.7 km) to the southeast of Kaş, Turkey
- 36°7′43″N 29°41′9″E
- Type: Site of a sunken ship
- Periods: Late Bronze Age
- Cultures: Mycenaean, Cypriote, judging by the pottery
- Associated with: Crew of the merchant vessel
- Location: Uneven slope of the headland's shelf, 44 m (144 ft) to 52 m (171 ft) deep, with artifacts down to 61 m (200 ft)
- Region: Bay of Antalya, off the Turquoise Coast.

History
- Built: In use late 14th century BC; date obtained by dendrochronological dating
- Built by: Unknown. The cargo was probably Mycenaean, deduced from the major type of ingot
- Abandoned: Sank late 14th century BCE
- Event(s): Collision with the headland, perhaps wind-driven

Site notes
- Material: Wooden, single-mast, two-prow (stem, stern) sailing ship with one steering oar on a side
- Height: Depth differential is 8 m (26 ft) vertical, with scattered artifacts, 17 m (56 ft)
- Length: About 10 m (33 ft) N-S, horizontal plot plan
- Width: About 18 m (59 ft) E-W, horizontal plot-plan
- Area: 180 m^{2} (1,900 sq ft), horizontal plot-plan
- Excavation dates: Excavational dives directed by George Bass in 1984, and Cemal Pulak in 1985–1994
- Archaeologists: George F. Bass, Cemal Pulak
- Condition: Conservation, sampling and study are ongoing
- Owner: Republic of Turkey
- Management: Institute of Nautical Archaeology, an international organization
- Public access: Objects may be viewed in the exhibit at the Bodrum Museum of Underwater Archaeology
- Website: "Uluburun, Turkey". 23 February 2020.

Uluburun ("Grand Cape" in Turkish) is a Late Bronze Age underwater archaeological site, located in the Mediterranean Sea south of Kaş, in Turkey where a shipwreck dated to the late 14th century BC was discovered. The sunken ship, approximately 15 meters long and carrying a cargo of over 20 tons, was lying at a depth of over 40 meters at the time of its discovery.

The shipwreck was discovered in the summer of 1982 by Mehmed Çakir, a local sponge diver from Yalıkavak, a village near Bodrum, and was subsequently excavated, from 1984 to 1994. It yielded a large quantity of very diverse objects. Its main cargoes were ingots of copper and tin (for bronze making), jars of terebinth resin, painted ceramics, and raw glass. But it also yielded various luxury items, personal effects, and utilitarian objects. At the time of its sinking, the ship was sailing from the east, probably the Levant (Near East) and/or Cyprus, westward toward the Aegean Sea, likely toward a city of the Mycenaean civilization in present-day Greece. In addition to its crew, merchants of Levantine (Canaanite) origin were on the ship, as well as people from Greece, or even further north in the Balkans.

Since its discovery, the Uluburun shipwreck has been the subject of numerous studies, whether analyses of its cargo or proposals on its economic or even political significance. It is certainly not the oldest shipwreck discovered in the Mediterranean, but it is the one with the richest cargo. It sheds light on the long-distance exchange of goods during a period of the Late Bronze Age, for which they were already extensively studied from the archives of el-Amarna in Egypt and Ugarit in Syria.

The cargo carried by the ship is generally considered to have been intended for a wealthy and powerful individual or group, perhaps a Mycenaean king, or at least a royal institution and members of the elite. It is however impossible to determine whether these were gifts sent as part of diplomatic relations, or goods bought through private commercial transactions by merchants on behalf of a sponsor (or both).

== Discovery and excavation ==
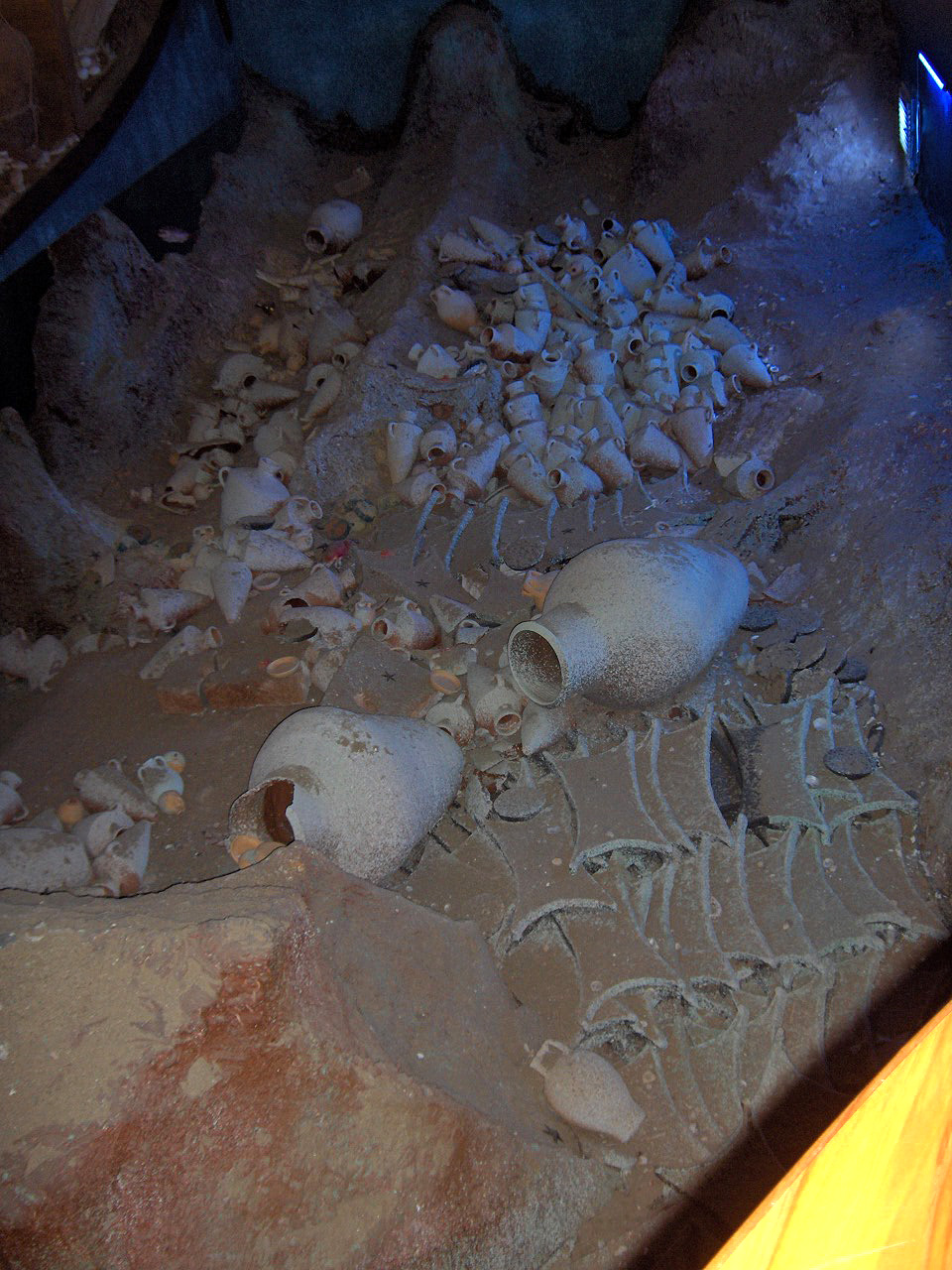
Reproduction of the excavation site at the Bodrum Museum of Underwater Archaeology.

The shipwreck site was discovered in the summer of 1982 due to Mehmet Çakir's sketching of "the metal biscuits with ears" recognized as oxhide ingots. Turkish sponge divers were often consulted by the Institute of Nautical Archaeology's (INA) survey team on how to identify ancient wrecks while diving for sponges. Çakir's findings urged Oğuz Alpözen, Director of the Bodrum Museum of Underwater Archaeology, to send out an inspection team of the Museum and INA archaeologists to locate the wreck site. The inspection team was able to locate several amounts of copper ingots just 50 metres from the shore of Uluburun.

The Institute of Nautical Archaeology (INA) began excavating in July 1984 under the direction of its founder, George F. Bass, and was then turned over to INA's vice president for Turkey, Cemal Pulak, who directed the excavation from 1985 to 1994. The wreck lay between 44 and 52 meters deep on a steep, rocky slope riddled with sand pockets. Half of the staff members who aided in the excavation lived in a camp built into the southeastern face of the promontory, which the ship most likely hit, while the other half lived aboard the Virazon, INA's research vessel at the time. The excavation site utilized an underwater telephone booth and air-lifts. The mapping of the site was done by triangulation. Meter tapes and metal squares were used as an orientation aid for excavators. Since the completion of the excavation in September 1994, all efforts have been concentrated on full-time conservation, study, and sampling for analysis in the conservation laboratory of the Bodrum Museum of Underwater Archaeology in Turkey.

Eleven consecutive campaigns of three to four months' duration took place from 1984 to 1994 totaling 22,413 dives, revealing one of the most spectacular Late Bronze Age assemblages to have emerged from the Mediterranean Sea.

The Bodrum Museum of Underwater Archaeology, housed within the Castle of St. Peter, displays artifacts recovered during excavations—along with a replica of the vessel—in its section dedicated to Late Bronze Age shipwrecks, which also includes items from the Cape Gelidonya shipwreck.

== Historical background ==
=== Dating ===
Peter Kuniholm of Cornell University was assigned the task of dendrochronological dating in order to obtain a date for the ship. A branch loaded on the ship was determined to exhibit tree-rings as late as 1305 BC; but given that no bark has survived it is impossible to determine if it had further, younger rings. It has been assumed that the ship sank not long after that date. Kuniholm later cautioned that the low quality of the sample does not allow an "especially strong" dating. After a radiocarbon calibration of the entire Anatolian dendrochronological sequence, Kuniholm suggested a new date, ca. 1327 BC.

Manning et al. conducted radiocarbon dating tests on several samples of plant material from the site. A sample from the cedar keel of the ship was construed as providing a terminus post quem for the construction phase. Other samples, including perishable items from short-lived species, like rope and dunnage, were construed to have come on board the ship in the phase of the last voyage. The two phases constrained each other, and Bayesian statistics was used to produce date ranges of varying probabilities. The most likely date of the sinking of the ship was rounded up to 1320±15 years.

Based on ceramic evidence, it appears that the Uluburun sank toward the end of the Amarna period, but could not have sunk before the time of Nefertiti due to the unique gold scarab engraved with her name found aboard the ship. For now, a conclusion that the ship sank at the end of the 14th century BC is accepted.

=== Late Bronze Age "globalization" ===
The geopolitical situation of the Near East and the Eastern Mediterranean towards the end of the 14th century and the beginning of the 13th century, with the location of the Uluburun and Cape Gelidonya shipwrecks.

The Uluburun shipwreck is a major source of information on the long-distance and maritime circulation of goods in the Eastern Mediterranean during the Late Bronze Age (ca. 1600-1200 BC), as it relates to a context of development of long-distance maritime trade, also documented in the contemporary archives of Ugarit and the Amarna Letters, as well as archaeological discoveries made at various continental sites and some other shipwrecks. The Uluburun documentation agrees with other testimonies from the period on the long-distance circulation of goods, which indicate that it was multi-directional, marked by reshipments of goods from transit points, and an evident diversity.

Thanks to the richness and diversity of its cargo, the Uluburun shipwreck remains to this day the most eloquent archaeological testimony to the development of maritime trade in the Eastern Mediterranean during the Late Bronze Age. It documents, more specifically, the relations between the Levant and the Aegean world. Two other shipwrecks from the same period documenting long-distance trade have been excavated: the one off Cape Gelidonya (Turkey) and the one off Cape Iria (Greece, Argolis), both later (ca. late 13th-early 12th century BC). However, they yielded more modest and far less diverse cargoes: copper ingots for the former and Cypriot ceramics for the latter.

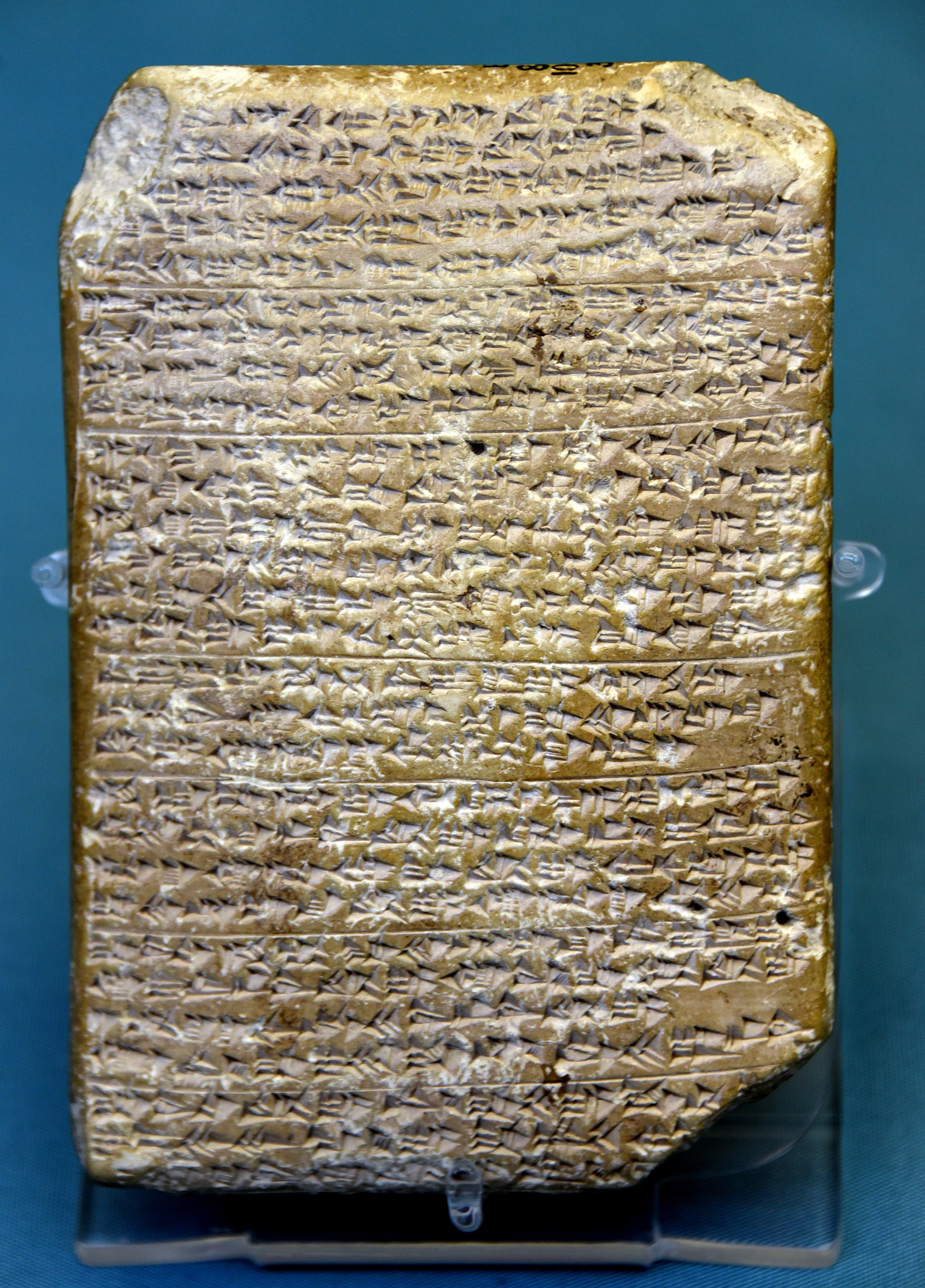
Amarna letter EA 35: The king of Alashiya (Cyprus) writes to the Egyptian king that he cannot send much copper because an epidemic is affecting his country, promising to send him more later, on the condition that silver is sent to him. British Museum.

From a geopolitical standpoint, this period is marked by the partitioning of the Near East and the eastern Mediterranean among a few major powers exercising their suzerainty over smaller kingdoms, "great kings" who maintained diplomatic relations as attested by the Amarna Letters. Egypt during the New Kingdom (the final part of the 18th Dynasty) exerted its dominance over most of the Levant, particularly the south, the land of Canaan, divided into several small kingdoms whose tumultuous political life is also documented by the Amarna Letters. Archaeology testifies to a certain dynamism in the coastal cities, well integrated into trade networks, but not all of these kingdoms were prosperous. The other major power in the region was the Hittite kingdom, who, after a period of decline, rose again and took control of the northern part of Syria, previously dominated by the kingdom of Mitanni, and also brought Egyptian vassals such as Ugarit and Qadesh under their rule. The island of Cyprus was probably dominated by the kingdom of Alashiya, which was not a major military power, but dealt on equal terms with the larger kingdoms, particularly because it possessed significant copper deposits, a metal necessary for forging bronze objects. The political situation in eastern Anatolia and the Aegean world is less well known due to a lack of sources. The main kingdom of eastern Anatolia, Arzawa, was defeated by the Hittites. For the Aegean world, a kingdom called Ahhiyawa is attested by some Hittite texts and could correspond to a part of the Mycenaean civilization, which left written sources in Linear B that do not document its geopolitical situation (it is unknown whether there were several independent kingdoms or one dominant power).

In this context, while it was weak politically, the Levant played a crucial role, as evidenced in particular by excavations at sites within the kingdom of Ugarit—located on the Syrian coast—which appears to have been a major hub in these networks. This is reflected, among other things, by a certain degree of cosmopolitanism, visible notably in the presence of Aegean ceramics and texts written in most of the scripts used at the time. The demand for goods—particularly metals, foremost among them copper and tin (used to produce bronze)—from Egypt and the Hittite Empire was likely a driving force behind these exchanges; this also explains the pivotal role played by Cyprus and its copper mines.

These political, commercial, and cultural interactions have led this period to be characterized as an "age of internationalism", marked by the existence of a "world-system" that linked centers (the great kingdoms, parts of the Levant) with peripheries (the Anatolian and Levantine margins, the Aegean world)—or even an ancient form of "globalization."

== Vessel ==
If we rely on the representations of ships from the period, especially those painted in the tomb of Qenamon (late 15th century BC) depicting Levantine merchant ships similar to that of Uluburun, they have a wide hull, a deck covering a hold, include a central mast on which is mounted a large square sail, as well as a crow's nest for observation. Large oars serve as a rudder, others to move the boat when there is not enough wind, but the techniques of the time clearly do not allow for efficient navigation against the wind.

The hull of the ship that sank at Uluburun has almost entirely disappeared. It is preserved only in places, notably at the keel. Based on the cargo layout, it has been estimated that the ship was approximately 15 meters long (around 49 ft) and approximately 5 meters wide (around 16 ft), for a cargo capacity of at least 20 tons. By the standards of the time, this is probably a large ship. It had been suggested that ships around twenty meters long existed in the Late Bronze Age, but this has been challenged.

Despite their modest size, the remains are very important as they constitute the oldest evidence of a deep-sea vessel in the Mediterranean and provide valuable information on construction methods, which can be compared to those of Egyptian river ships. The planks are made of Lebanese cedar, which aligns with Levantine Bronze Age written sources that describe it as the preferred material for shipbuilding. Dating of the wood (by dendrochronology) indicates that it was felled in the second third of the 14th century.

Regarding construction techniques, this vessel yielded the oldest known archaeological example of a keel (a "proto-keel" according to C. Pulak), demonstrating an understanding of the need to reinforce the center of the ship. It is wider than it is tall (28 × 22 cm), which distinguishes it from those of Greek and Roman ships. The recovered fragments also indicate that the hull sections were joined using the mortise and tenon method, already attested in Egypt and later disseminated by the Phoenicians. The tenons and pegs were made of oak. This method was intended to ensure the vessel's robustness.

One of the anchors found in the wreck of the Uluburun. Weight: 148.3 kg. Bodrum Museum of Underwater Archaeology.

The ship carried 22 coastal sandstone (or beachrock) anchors, and two smaller limestone anchors, for a total weight of 3.3 tons, the largest groupe found in a shipwreck. They are pierced with a hole for an anchor cable or hawster. Petrographic analysis showed that most of them originated from the Carmel coast (and a few from the rest of Levant, maybe including the Ugarit region for the limestone ones), which is one of the main elements for identifying the ship's origin. They were arranged in two groups: 16 towards the bow, probably for quick access for anchoring (two of them were placed further forward, probably on the foredeck, ready for use), and 8 in the center, at the bottom of the hold, probably to serve as temporary ballast. The large quantity of anchors carried could be justified by the fact that they were often lost during use, and therefore many had to be taken if one were planning a long journey such as this one.

== Cargo ==
=== Overview ===
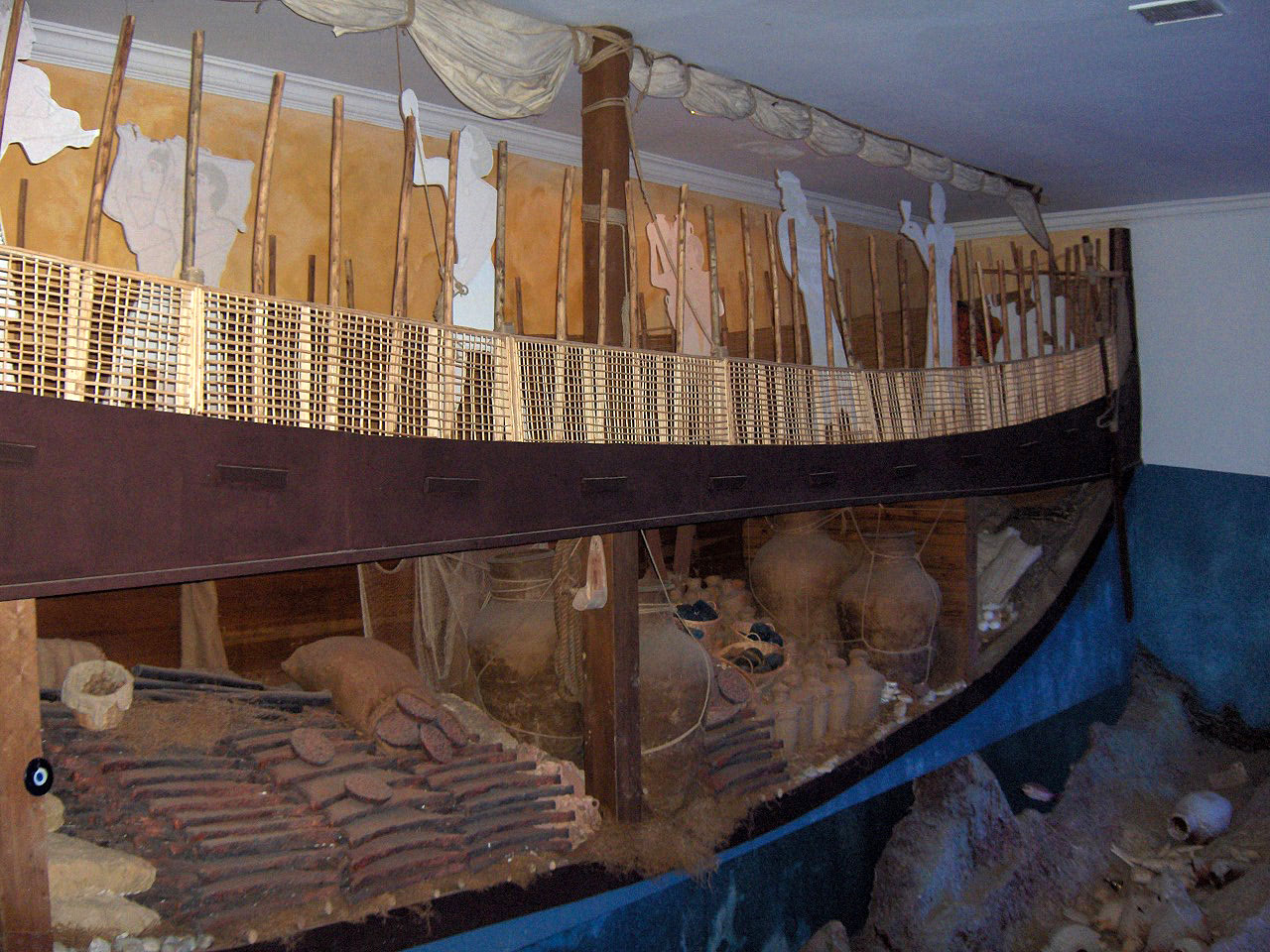
Reconstruction of the cargo layout in the ship's hold at the Bodrum Museum of Underwater Archaeology.

As underlined by E. Cline: "the ship contained a microcosm of the international trade and contacts that were ongoing in the Eastern Mediterranean, and across the Aegean," and "goods from at least seven different areas." Indeed, the goods and objects found in the Uluburun shipwreck are very diverse:

- 354 ingots of copper (approximately 10 tons), the importance of which is known from archaeological finds and contemporary archives;
- ingots of tin (approximately 1 ton), tin and copper being the constituents of bronze;
- 150 Canaanite jars of three different sizes, flasks and large jars (pithoi): their contents reveal remains of terebinth resin, grapes, figs, pomegranate, olives, and spices such as coriander and sumac;
- approximately 175 ingots of raw glass, cobalt blue, turquoise, and lavender in color, among the oldest known in this material;
- elephant ivory, hippopotamus teeth, numerous murex shells, ostrich eggs, tortoise shells, faience beads, hard stones, ebony in the form of logs originating from Nubia, and other materials;
- Cypriot ceramics;
- tableware made of copper alloy and tin;
- various gold and silver jewelry and objects, many from the Levant, including a chalice, a gold scarab (amulet) bearing the name of the Egyptian queen Nefertiti, and a bronze statuette partially covered with gold leaf;
- bronze tools (sickles, punches, drills, saw, pliers, chisels, etc.) and weapons (arrowheads, spearheads, maces, daggers, axes, swords);
- two wooden tablets originally covered with a wax surface on which writing was made (inscription now lost);
- around 3 tons of anchors and stone ballast.

The majority of these items constitute the ship’s actual cargo—the goods it was transporting for distribution to their recipients— with a total weight of approximately 17 tons (20 tons of cargo minus the anchors)..

Another part consists of the personal effects of the ship's passengers and crew. But it is often difficult to tell whether an object falls into this category or is merchandise. Also found, though in much smaller quantity, were unwanted "passengers": snails that had arrived with part of the cargo (notably terebinth resin). In addition to helping identify the geographical origin of these products, their presence shows that even at this early era, humans were unwittingly playing a role in the dispersal of animal species to new regions.

=== Metal ingots ===
The shipwreck yielded 354 copper ingots, which were stacked in rows in the center of the vessel and also in its stern. The majority, 317, are of the so-called "oxhide" shape, with a protrusion on each of the four corners. This was the common form in which this metal circulated during this period, known from other archaeological excavations and widespread in the Middle East, the Mediterranean, and even beyond (some have been found as far as present-day Germany). This was also the main cargo of the Cape Gelidonya shipwreck, which sunk a century after the Uluburun shipwreck. The ingots weighed on average around 24 kilograms. As for the rest, 31 ingots have only two protrusions; the others have different shapes and weights, for example, those shaped like buns which weigh on average around 6.2 kilograms. The existence of standards must have facilitated their weighing and accounting. These are made of pure copper, originating from Cyprus, by far the main source of this metal in the Eastern Mediterranean at that time. These ingots must have been produced in primary processing centers, after mining and probably initial transport, in order to facilitate their circulation. Some bear marks such as incisions, which were applied during their circulation, perhaps before loading. The total weight of the copper cargo is estimated at approximately 10 tons.

Large oxhide copper ingot, , with a mark.

Copper oxhide ingot with two protrusions.

Small oxhide copper shaped.

Bun-shaped (plano-convex discoid) copper ingot.

Small oxhide copper ingot, pillow-shaped.

The shipwreck also yielded ingots of tin, for an approximate weight of 1 ton. Some of them underwent a structural change upon contact with seawater and disintegrated during excavation, suggesting that there may have been more originally. The shapes are very diverse: oxhide (often cut into quarter of halves), discoidal, rectangular slab, and also one shaped like an anchor with a hole near one end. Some have been cut up, probably during previous transactions (such as taxation). It is therefore a less homogeneous assemblage than the copper, probably assembled from various indirect sources.

Tin ingot, half-oxhide.

Slab-shaped tin ingot.

The copper and tin ingots were certainly intended to be used for the production of bronze. With them, 11 tons of high quality bronze with a copper/tin ratio of 9 to 1 could be melted. This quantity would have been enough, for example, to forge almost 5,000 swords. The Cypriot origin of the copper has long been known (due to the isotopic composition of its lead, and from texts of the period), but that of the tin had remained a mystery. In 2022, its chemical composition (particularly its tellurium and lead content) and isotopic composition (tin and lead isotopes) were compared to those of all known tin sources from the British Isles to Central Asia. Approximately 65% of the tin originates from the Kestel archaeological site, located in the Taurus Mountains in present-day Turkey, about a week's walk from the port of Mersin (where the ship may have stopped). Approximately 30% comes from the Mušiston deposit (Tajikistan) or eastern Uzbekistan, generally better quality tin, which explains why it traveled such a long distance.

=== Storage Jars ===
The main container identified on the wreck is the so-called "Canaanite" jar, a terracotta vessel with side handles. It is an ancestor of the amphorae of the Greek and Roman periods, both in form and function. This type of pottery is found at numerous sites of the period, in the Near East and the Aegean world. More than 150 of these jars have been recovered at Uluburun. While they all have a similar shape, these jars fall into three groups of different sizes: the smallest (representing about 75 percent), have an average capacity of 6.7 liters; the medium ones (about 11 percent) are about twice that volume; and the largest hold 26.7 liters, which could correspond to a unit of capacity attested at Ugarit, the "jar" (kd). Petrographic analyses indicate that the majority of these jars are made with clay from the Mount Carmel region, with another group originating from the Sidon region. They contained primarily terebinth Pistacia resin, found in about a hundred of them. Others were used to transport olives (one yielded at least 2,500 olive pits), while one was filled with glass beads. They were stoppered with organic material and a potsherd, then sealed with mud or clay.

The "pilgrim flask" is the second largest group of vessels carried in the boat. This is a lentoid-shaped terracotta vessel with a narrow neck and two lateral handles. These flasks have various capacities, from 0.16 to 8.84 liters. They are undecorated, whereas other examples found at sites in the Levant are painted, indicating that they were on the ship as containers and not as commercial goods. Petrographic analyses indicate that they come from the coastal part of the southern Levant. They were generally used to contain liquids such as oil. They were found surrounded by various seeds, including figs, but these are more likely intrusions of fruit remains that were transported on the boat.

A dozen or so large Cypriot jars (pithos) were also found. These were containers for liquids (oil?), fruit (pomegranates), other Cypriot ceramics, and probably other goods as well. They may also have served as merchandise intended for sale upon the ship's arrival.

Canaanite jar.

Pilgrim flask.

=== Terebinth resin ===
The main content of the Canaanite jars is terebinth resin, probably from the Atlantic pistachio tree (Pistacia atlantica). Identified in about a hundred of them (two-thirds), it appeared at the time of excavation as a yellowish substance. This would represent a weight of over half a ton, making it the second largest cargo by weight, after metals. This resin was used to make perfumed oils and incense, as well as to be added to wine to limit bacterial growth, and also as an antiseptic. Analysis of pollen and snail shells found in the jars indicates that the resin came from trees growing in the region of the Jordan Valley, the Dead Sea, and the Sea of Galilee. We know that it was a Canaanite export or tribute product, particularly appreciated in Egypt, and of great financial value.

=== Glass ingots ===
Circular ingots of glass were found in varying states of preservation. It is estimated that the boat contained around 175 of them, for a total weight of approximately 350 kilograms. This raw, opaque glass was then used to make manufactured objects, among them small vases and beads. The best-preserved ingots are mostly cobalt blue and also turquoise blue. At least two are purple and one is amber. Chemical analyses of the alkalis and coloring agents indicate that they originated in the Near East and Egypt, and the cobalt blue ingots are similar to those discovered at Tell el-Amarna in Egypt. They were prized in this country because their color is reminiscent of lapis lazuli, a precious stone that was highly valued but very difficult to obtain since it came from Afghanistan.

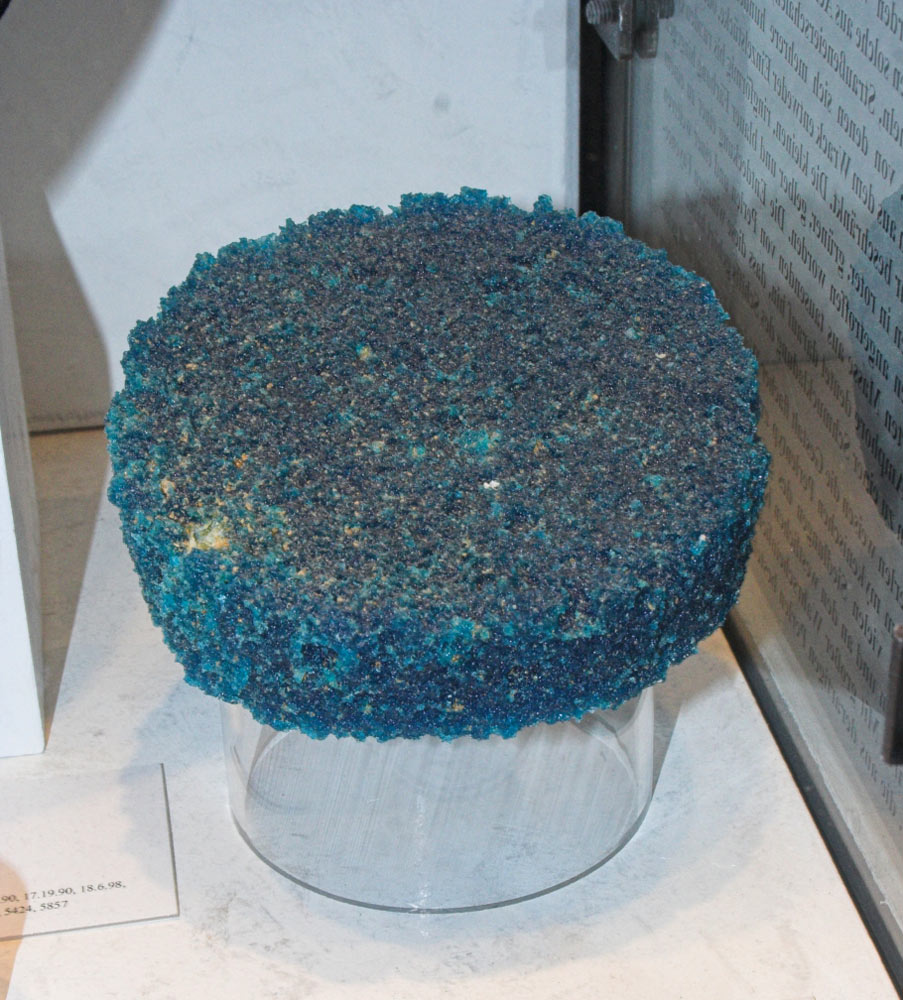
Cobalt blue glass ingot.

Glass ingots of different shades.

Glass ingots of different shades.

=== Other raw materials ===
Eighteen small logs of african blackwood (Dalbergia melanoxylon), a type of ebony, were found in a more or less fragmentary state. They measure about one meter, which seems to correspond to a length of two Egyptian royal cubits (52.4 cm). This is the darkest part of the wood, the most valuable, used particularly for making furniture. It is a product originating in East Africa, around present-day Somalia, which passed through Nubia and then Egypt, from where it was exported to the Near East and the Aegean, in the form of logs or furniture. The fact that this is raw material indicates that Mycenaean workshops worked this wood to make furniture (tablets from Pylos mention ebony furniture).

The Uluburun shipwreck yielded raw ivory: a large piece of elephant tusk and fourteen hippopotamus teeth. It is not possible to determine whether the elephant was of the African or Asian (Western) type, as the two main sources of elephant ivory at the time were Nubia and Syria. These materials were used in Late Bronze Age workshops to make engraved plaques, combs and pins, furniture inlays, figurines, and small containers. These are products commonly documented by archaeology, as well as by texts and images. Elephant ivory is more durable and therefore probably more prized, but this find indicates that the hippopotamus tooth occupied a more important place than has long been thought.

Other raw materials intended for workshops consist of: three ostrich eggshells (from Africa or the Near East), often used to make containers; orpiment, a mineral mainly used as a pigment and as a colorant for glass; remains of thousands of opercula from murex shells (Murex opercula), which may have been used as an ingredient for incense.

Hippopotamus incisor.

Hippopotamus canines.

Piece of elephant tusk

Ostrich eggshell.

The vessels carried as containers (or even baskets or bags of perishable material that have since disappeared) contained unprocessed or minimally processed foodstuffs, samples of which have been identified: almonds, dried figs, grapes (and/or wine), pomegranates, olives, barley, and wheat. Some of these items were likely intended for commercial purposes, while others served as food for the people on board the ship. Spices were also identified: coriander, black cumin, safflower, and sumac.

=== Manufactured Products ===
The cargo carried a range of finished or manufactured goods intended for sale. These are predominantly Cypriot products. Some of the Canaanite items appear to be personal effects of the crew rather than merchandise, but this is often difficult to confirm.

In particular, the wreck contained 155 objects of Cypriot ceramics, a significant quantity (more than double the amount of Cypriot ceramics found in the Aegean world). These are of diverse types: primarily vessels such as jars, jugs and juglets, bowls, kraters (which also served as containers, as mentioned above), oil lamps, and wall brackets. Fine tableware represents at least 137 objects, notably painted ceramics such as juglets of "White Shaved Ware" and "White Slip II" milk bowls with handles.

Cypriot juglet with a light-colored, shaved body (White Shaved Ware).

Cypriot milk bowl with whitish slip (White slip II).

Cypriot bowl with ring base (Base Ring).

Cypriot Bucchero jugs with a ring base (Base Ring).

Cypriot oil lamps (unused).

Cypriot wall bracket.

The ship also carried pottery made of copper alloy and tin, but it was badly damaged by corrosion from time spent underwater. The copper pottery included bowls and a large cauldron. The tin objects are particularly interesting as they are otherwise very rarely attested for the Late Bronze Age: a pilgrim flask, a plate, and a double-handed cup. It is not certain that these were goods, as they could have been the personal tableware of passengers.

Tin vessels: cup, flask and plate (folded).

Gold and silver objects were found in a much better state of preservation. The most important piece is a gold chalice weighing about 236 grams. Its origin is uncertain, as it is an unusual type for the period. The wreck also yielded a gold-plated bronze nude female figurine, engraved gold pendants depicting, among other things, a nude goddess and a falcon, four gold medallions representing rayed stars (objects of Syro-Canaanite manufacture), and a small Egyptian gold scarab bearing the name of Queen Nefertiti, wife of King Akhenaten, who reigned for a few years before the ship sank. The rest of the gold and silver objects consist mainly of whole or fragmentary jewelry, a circular gold ingot, silver bar ingots, and various shapeless scrap pieces, which must have had a monetary use.

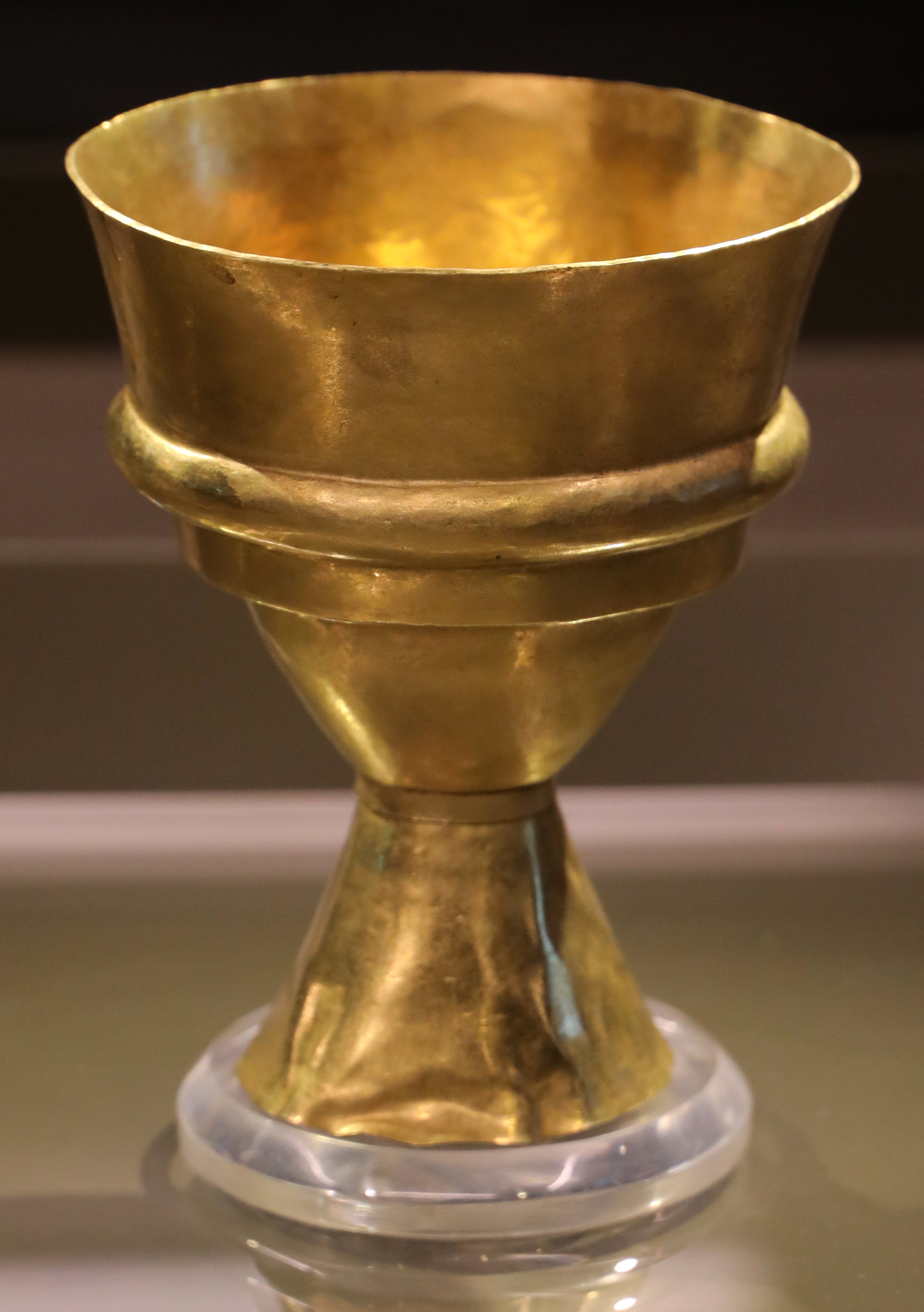
Gold chalice.

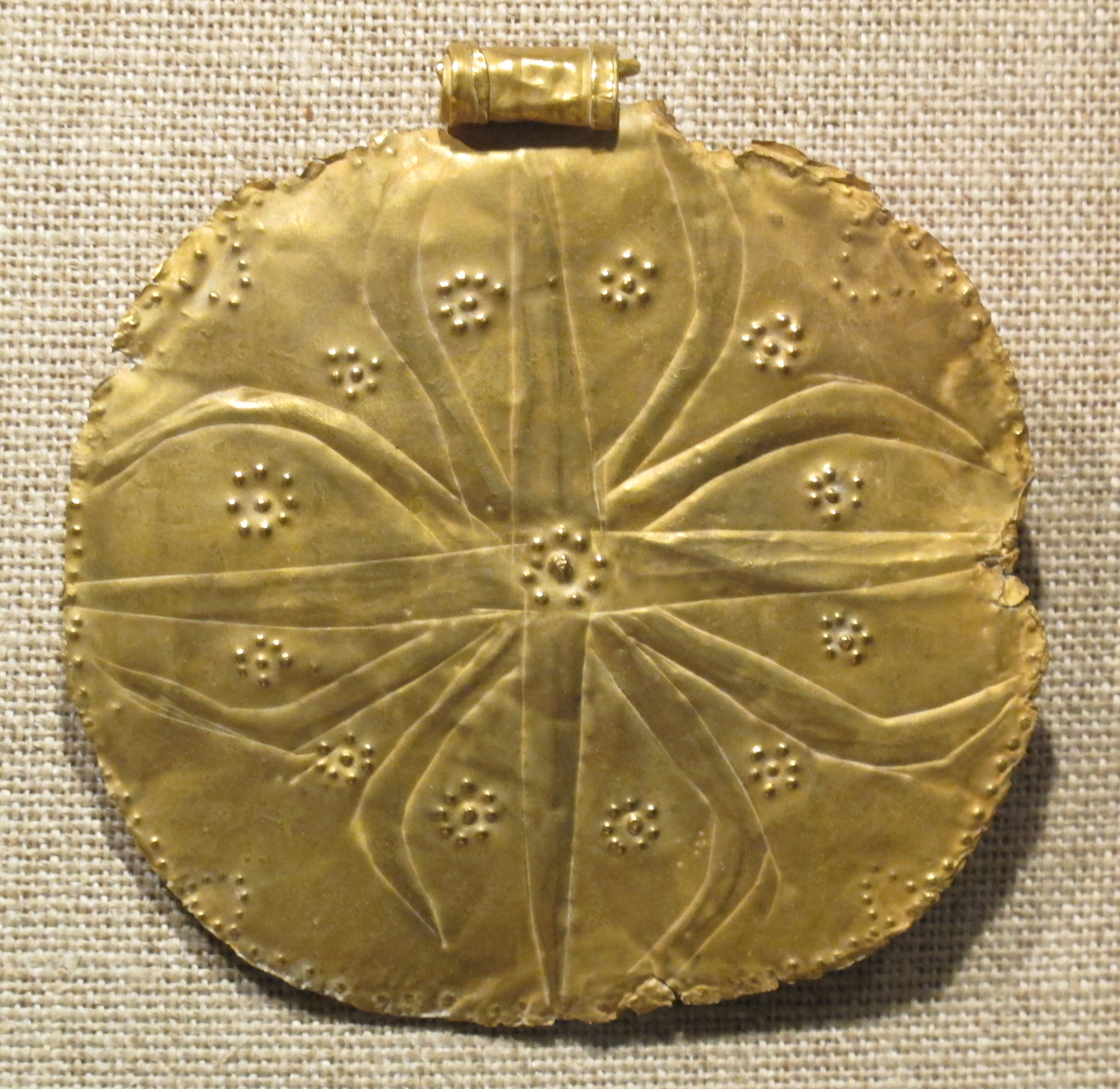
Disc with a radiant star.

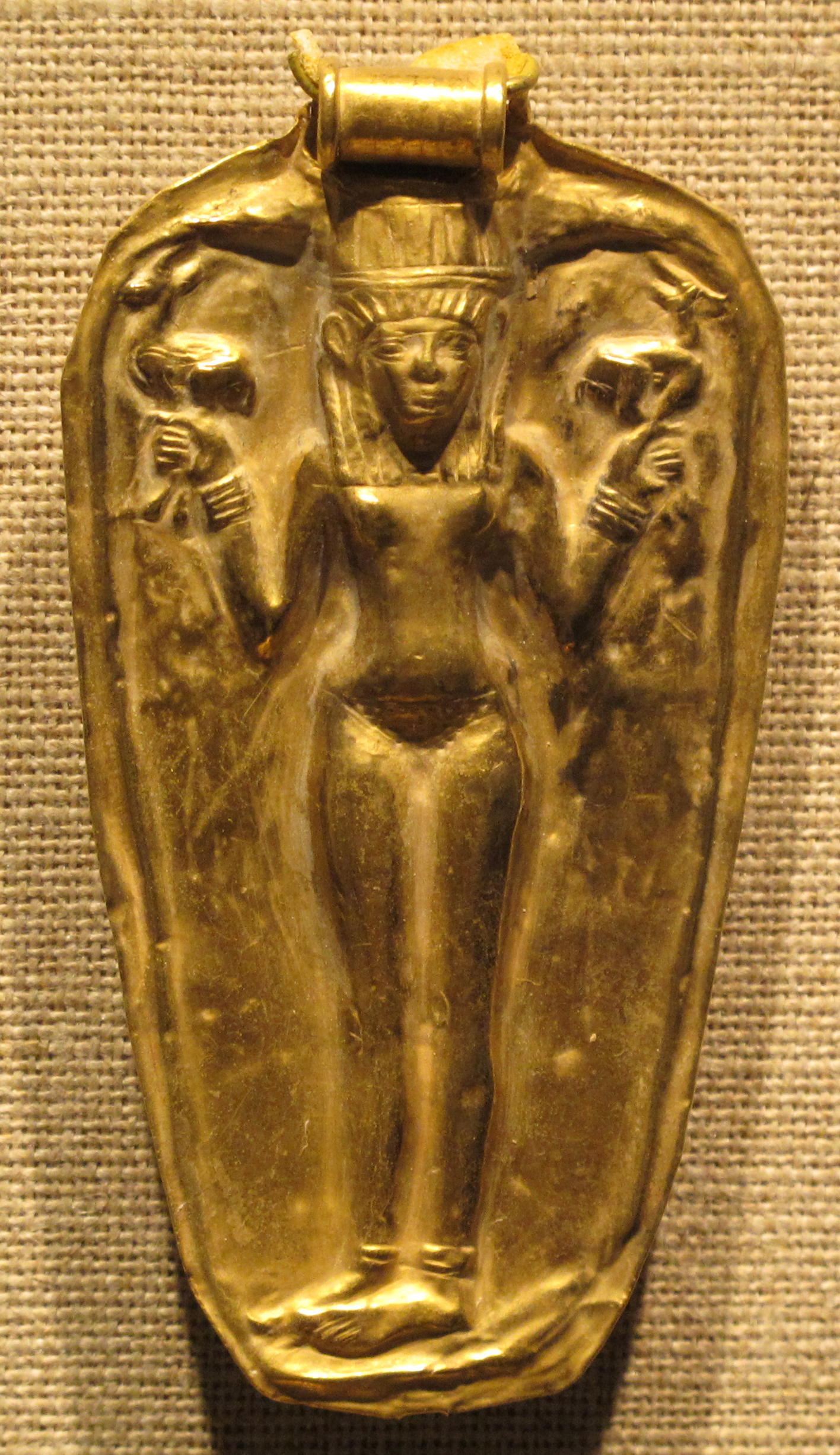
Pendant representing a nude woman

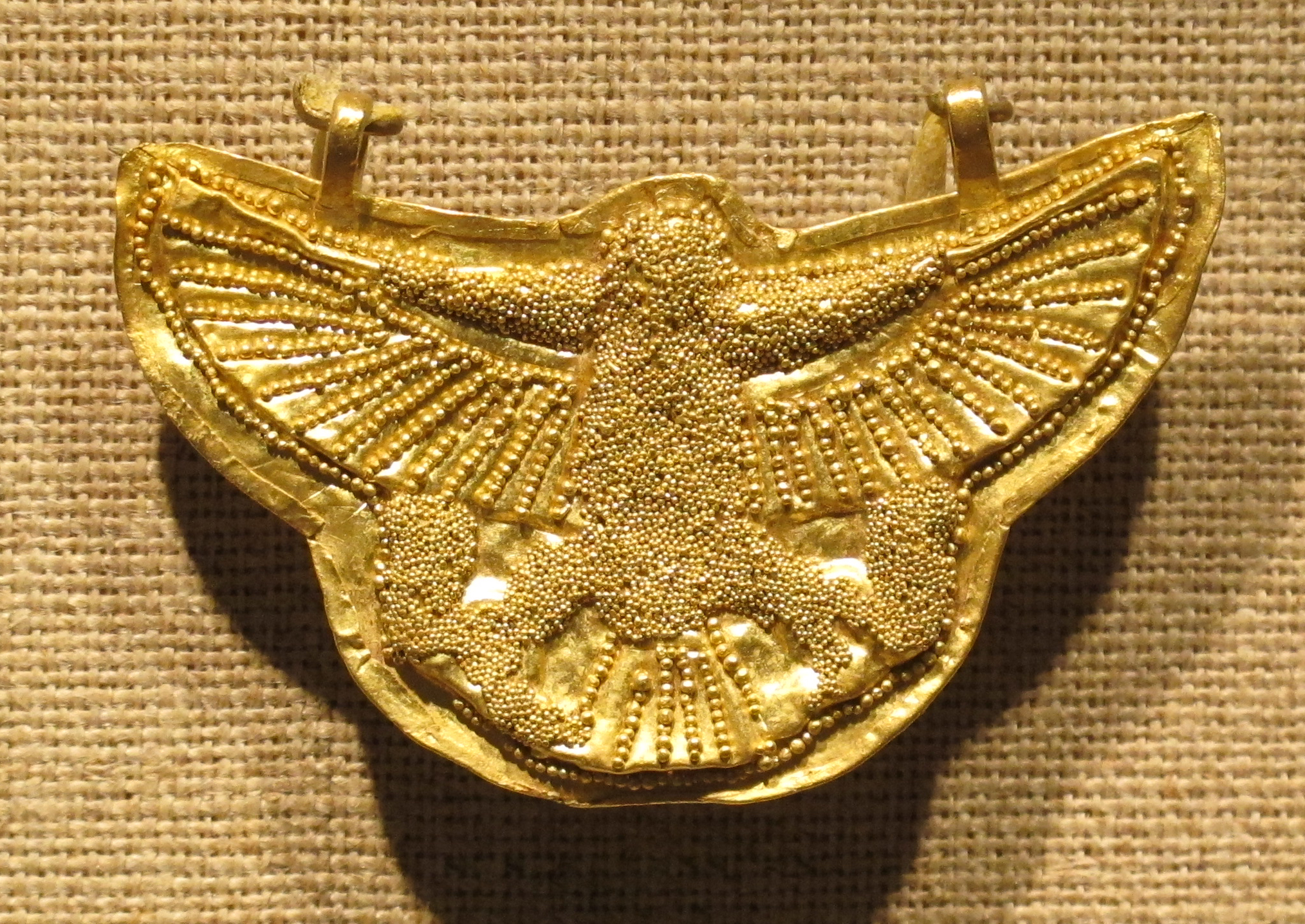
Gold pendant representing a falcon.

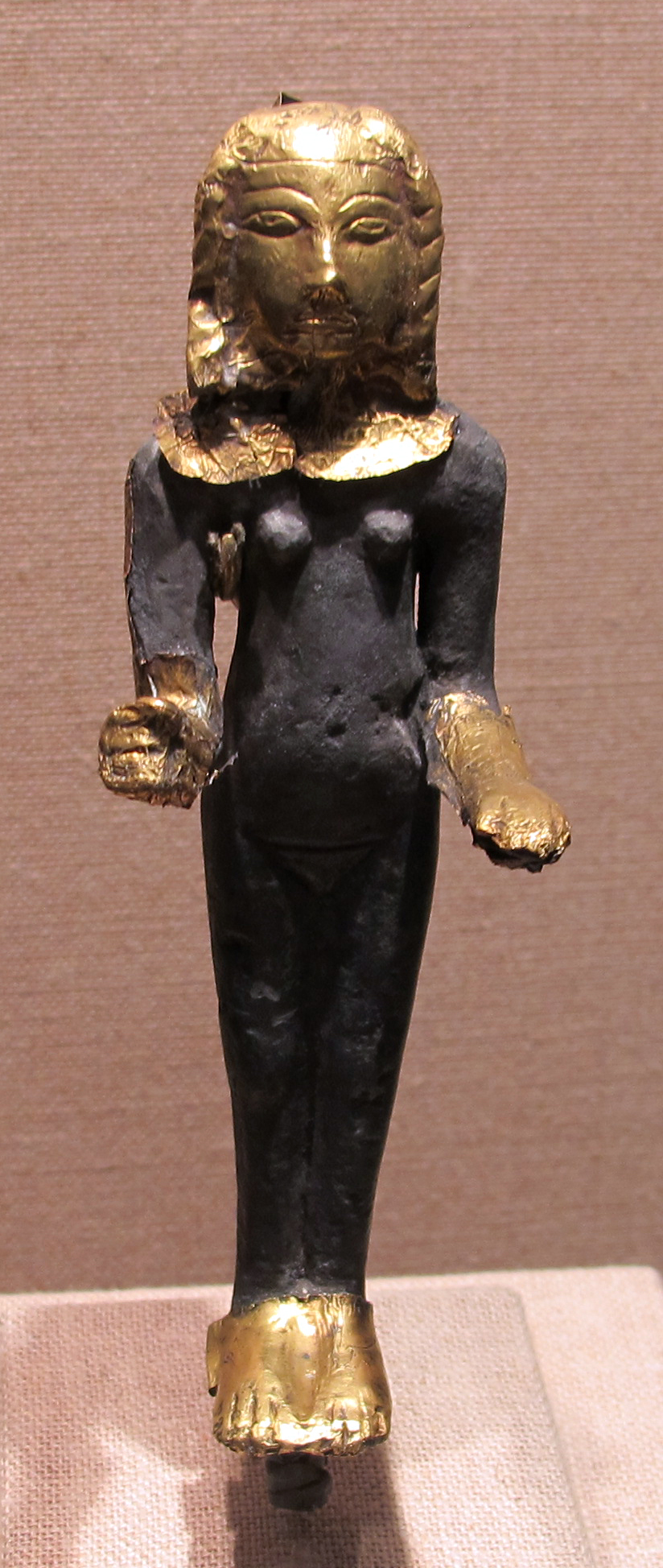
Female bronze figurine plated with gold.

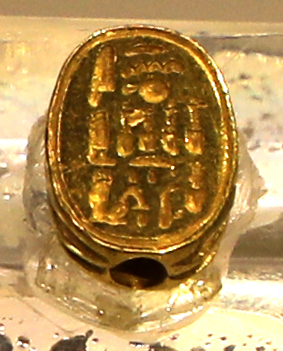
Scarab in the name of Nefertiti.
Gold scrap.

Silver scrap.

The Uluburun shipwreck contained fragments of two duck-shaped ivory vases, a type of container used at the time for cosmetics and ointments. Other vases of this type are known from other Late Bronze Age sites. These were then luxury items, requiring a high level of skill to create. Another ivory object found in the wreck is a kind of handle in the form of an acrobat, which has a parallel found at Kamid el-Loz in Lebanon, but which, according to C. Pulak, was more likely a personal (ritual?) object belonging to a passenger. Other ivory objects (a pin, a carved horn) seem to belong to this same category.

Ivory vase in the shape of a duck, for cosmetic use.

Another more fragmentary duck-shaped container.

Handle in the shape of an acrobat or dancer.

Among the other figurative objects are four ram-headed vessels (rhytons, probably drinking cups), only one of which is preserved in good condition. Similar vases have been found at Levantine sites from this period. These, too, would seem to have been personal objects.

The jars contained numerous beads used for jewelry. One of them yielded approximately 8,000 glass beads. Colored beads made of a vitreous material, so-called "faience," were also found. They are red, yellow, black, and blue, some of which may have been used to decorate objects or clothing that have since disappeared. A concentration of approximately 70,000 of these small beads indicates that they must have been piled up in a container bag. A good part of the cargo of beads therefore circulated in a "semi-finished" form and had to be assembled in workshops at their place of destination. Other beads of the same type and beads of agate, rock crystal and other hard stones, of amber, and also of ostrich egg, seem rather to have been part of the clothing of passengers of the ship.

Jar containing glass beads.

Amber beads.

Beads mounted in necklaces, including discoid beads made of ostrich eggshell.

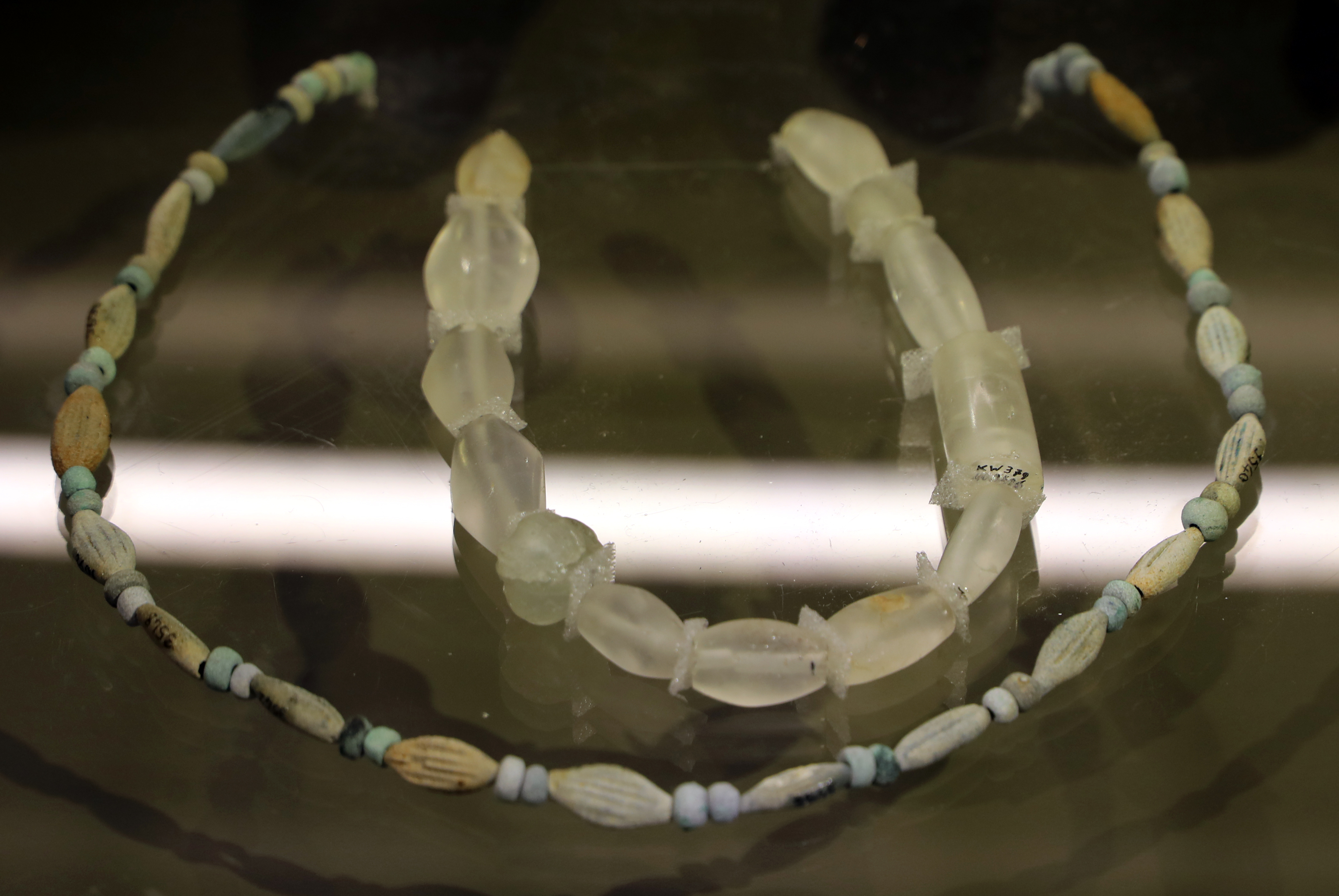
Necklaces of earthenware and rock crystal pearls.

Among the luxury goods finds were also twenty-eight shell bracelets (of the type coness or conchs, probably from the Persian Gulf or the Indian Ocean), whose exterior is covered with bitumen (from Mesopotamia) which was used to inlay pieces of colored glass, triangular or quadrangular in shape, of which almost nothing remains.

Bracelets made of shell inlaid with bitumen.

Jars also yielded textile fiber remnants dyed blue, purple, and red. These are clearly the remains of high-quality fabrics, likely including some luxury garments such as those worn by the Bronze Age elite. The dye, made from the mollusk Murex, is the product of a high-quality craft, documented particularly in the kingdom of Ugarit.

Manufactured objects made of wood have also left some traces: two circular containers, high-quality vases.

=== Economic value ===
C. Monroe attempted to assess the financial value of the cargo, in a "currency" of the Late Bronze Age, the silver shekel of Ugarit (the best-documented trading port for the period). The shekel is, first and foremost, a unit of weight—with one unit corresponding to approximately 9.3 to 9.4 grams-that served as a standard for exchange, since currency was weighed rather than counted at the time. It was also the standard used as the basis for the majority of weights recovered from the shipwreck. This allows to estimate the cargo's value in relation to the prices prevailing in this kingdom, thus giving an idea of its importance. According to him, it would amount to a sum of approximately 12,000 shekels (around 112 kilograms) of silver, representing the annual wages of workers in a large city. A copper ingot was worth approximately 15 shekels in Ugarit, which was also roughly the value of an ox, so the quantity of copper taken on board (which would be equivalent to more than 4,800 shekels) would allow the purchase of more than 350 head of cattle in this city. However, considerable uncertainty surrounds the valuation of the terebinth resin cargo, which, according to this historian's high estimate based on prices in Egypt, could be worth approximately 5,000 shekels of silver, thus slightly more than the copper cargo. The financial value of the cargo would therefore rest primarily on these two commodities. In any case, the shipwreck represents a considerable financial loss. But it remains impossible to estimate its economic impact without knowing the identity of those who chartered the ship and their financial resources.

== Interpretations ==
=== Route ===
Map with the probable route of the ship from Uluburun until its sinking (solid lines), and the rest of the probable circuit it made (dashed lines). With the probable regions of origin of the raw materials of the cargo, as well as ceramics. Adapted from C. Pulak (2008).

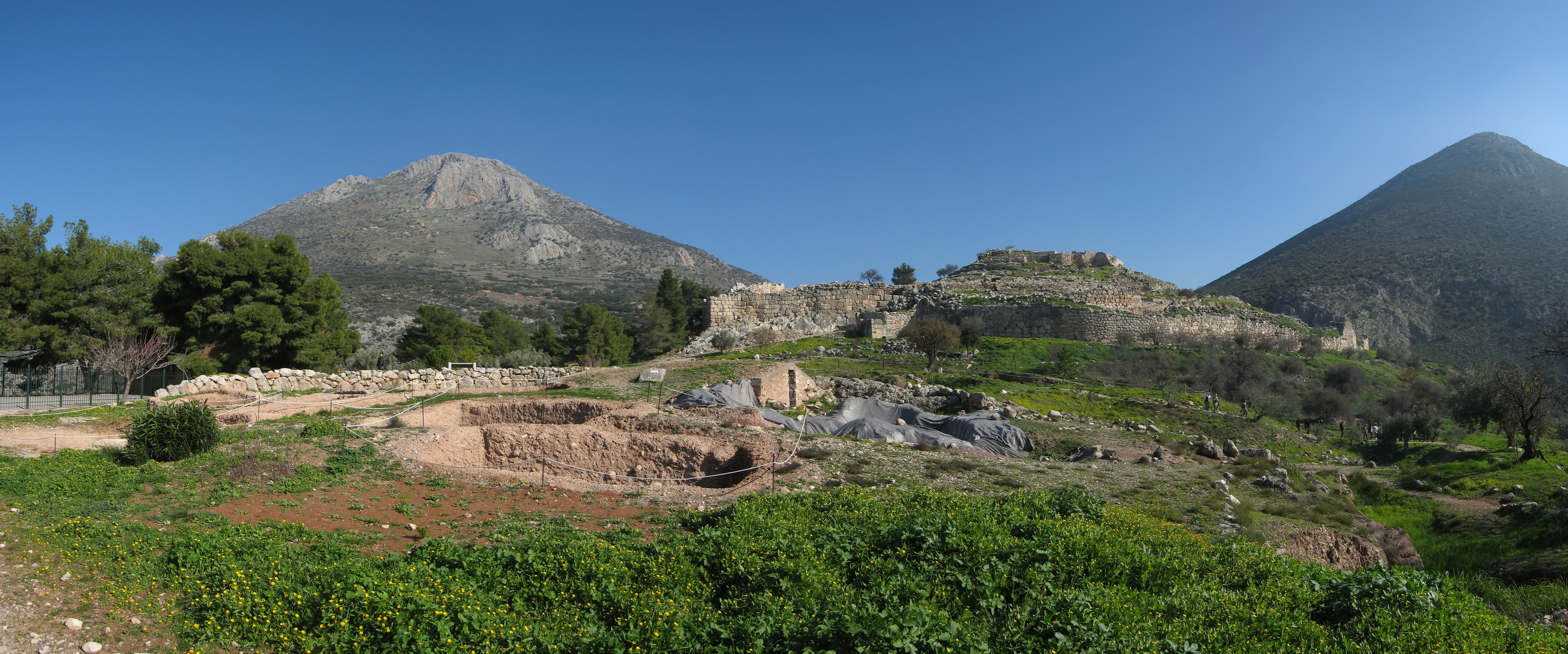
Ruins of the city of Mycenae, one of the possible destinations of the cargo from the Uluburun shipwreck.

The Uluburun ship carried a cargo of Asian and African artifacts, indicating an eastern origin. But the precise ship's place of origin is undetermined. The most plausible possibilities are Cyprus, then dominated by an independent kingdom called Alashiya, and the Levant, namely the land of Canaan, then politically composed of small kingdoms under Egyptian suzerainty, or Ugarit further north, a vassal of Egypt that fell under the influence of the Hittites. C. Pulak favors the second solution, as analyses have determined that the ship's anchors, as well as the utilitarian pottery (dishes and lamps), came from the Mount Carmel region. The ship's home port would therefore be one of those identified there for the Late Bronze Age: Tell Abu Hawam (Haifa, in the bay of Acre, at the mouth of the Kishon River) which served as a port for the city of Megiddo; or Tel Dor, Tell es-Samak, Tel Akko (Acre)..

But this is not necessarily the departure point of the ship's last journey, or at least its last stop, as shipping along coastal routes, port to port (cabotage) was common in ancient times. It is therefore possible that the cargo may have been assembled in several stages at different ports, rather than in a single shipment, although the latter is the preferred option for the excavation team. The port of Ugarit, Minet el-Beida (in Syria), is thus an attractive possibility for a stopover (or even departure point), as it was one of the main Levantine trading ports of the Late Bronze Age, very well integrated into long distance trade networks. It is also possible that the ship stopped in Egypt, or even that this country was its point of departure (an option considered by those who believe it was a diplomatic expedition). Given that it has been determined that most of the tin came from the Taurus Mountains, a stopover at a port on the western part of the southern Anatolian coast (such as Ura) is also conceivable. Given that the cargo of the Uluburun shipwreck included a large quantity of copper ingots from Cyprus, as well as Cypriot pottery, it is tempting to assume that it originated from, or at least passed through, that island. However, this solution is dismissed by C. Pulak, due to the fact that the cargo's Cypriot pottery is a heterogeneous assemblage, which seems to suggest that the objects were collected and shipped from a port in the Levant; a cargo collected near their place of manufacture would have been more coherent. This collection point could be Tell Abu Hawam, which has yielded a significant quantity of Cypriot pottery, some of which was stored there for shipment elsewhere. In any case, a Levantine port is also a very good candidate for collecting goods from further east and from the Egyptian world, as local archaeological discoveries and texts indicate that the cities of the region played a pivotal role in the long-distance circulation of goods. The existence of contacts with the Aegean world is also well documented by ceramic imports. On the other hand, evidence of exports from the Levant and Cyprus to Mycenaean Greece is more limited.

In any case, the ship's final intended destination was probably the Aegean region, which it would have reached had it rounded the cape of Uluburun. The Mycenaean civilization flourished in mainland Greece, likely divided politically into several kingdoms. This is the most widely accepted theory, given the shipwreck's location on the route between the Aegean and the Levant, and also the presence in the wreck of personal belongings of two elite individuals from that region (see below). Its exact destination could then have been Tiryns, the port of Mycenae, the main center of this culture. Pylos in Messenia, Knossos and Kommos in Crete are other possible destinations, as is Rhodes. Anyway, the boat did not reach its destination and sank before even entering the Aegean Sea, during the difficult passage of Cape Uluburun.

=== Crew and passengers ===
C. Pulak has proposed deductions about the origin of the crew, based on the various provenances of personal items (or at least items interpreted as such) found in the wreck, although reservations have been expressed about the reliability of such an approach.

The merchants and crew were probably of Canaanite origin, that is, from one of the ports of the southern Levant, the ancient land of Canaan. As mentioned above, the best candidates are ports on the coast of Carmel. Among the personal possessions, the 150 balance weights are crucial for identifying the presence of merchants, for whom these objects were essential because the "currency" of the time was weighted metal (first and foremost silver). The common standard weight is 9.3/9.4 grams, probably of the "Canaanite" type, but some weights seem to correspond to a Mesopotamian standard. They would be divided into four lots, indicating the presence of four merchants. Also attributed to this group were cylinder seals, a type of seal characteristic of the ancient Near East, unrolled onto tablets and clay sealing bullae, in order to identify their bearers. A sword and three decorated daggers would also be associated with them, the first belonging to the head of the merchants and thus establishing a hierarchy among them.

Canaanite type daggers.

Stone weights.

Zoomorphic bronze weights.

Cylinder seal in rock crystal set in gold, Babylonian kassite production.

Writing board found in the Uluburun shipwreck.

Two rectangular boxwood tablets joined by an ivory hinge have been reconstructed from fragments: this is a portable writing board, the tablets having a recessed area in their center for spreading wax on which one could write with a stylus. Other finds indicate the probable presence of other writing tablets on the ship. These objects would have belonged to the merchants, used in particular to record the contents of the cargo. This discovery is remarkable because no other writing boards of this type are known archaeologically from the Late Bronze Age.

As seen above, various manufactured objects, generally of Canaanite production and of varying quality, would seem to be part of the crew's personal effects rather than the cargo proper, whether they were utilitarian objects, ornaments or ritual objects: ram-headed vases, ivory pins, perhaps some of the gold objects.

The Canaanite origin of the rest of the crew, the sailors, seems to be confirmed by the presence of levantine type everyday objects such as daggers, knives, and pendants, which do not allow us to determine the crew's size. They used oil lamps for light, of Canaanite-Syrian type, with a pinched beak. For their food, they had stone mortars and simple bowls. Some of their food was stored on the boat, but they also consumed fish caught on board, as the wreck yielded fishhooks, a trident, a harpoon, and numerous fishing net weights. The excavations also produced knucklebones, indicating that the crew had brought along some entertainment for the voyage.

Canaanite-type oil lamps.

Hooks.

Fishing trident.

Knucklebones.

Non-Canaanite passengers have been identified by objects originating from the Aegean world, more specifically from mainland Greece of the Mycenaean civilization: lenticular seals, flat scissors and double axes, as well as swords, beads, fine pottery that likely constituted a drinking set, and stirrup jars typical of this culture. These objects are personal in nature and seem to fall into two groups, indicating the presence of two Mycenaeans on the ship. They are characteristic of the elite of this society: these persons would therefore have been either emissaries or messengers on a diplomatic mission, or merchants, or both. A third individual is identified by the presence of objects of more northerly origin, with parallels to present-day Bulgaria and Romania: a bronze pin, spearheads, a sword, and a mace. The fact that these objects have a warlike character suggests a mercenary in the service of the Mycenaeans; but it could be another emissary.

Mycenaean drinking set.

Stirrup jars.

Blue glass relief beads decorated with spirals.

Mycenaean bronze swords.

Mycenaean bronze spear points.

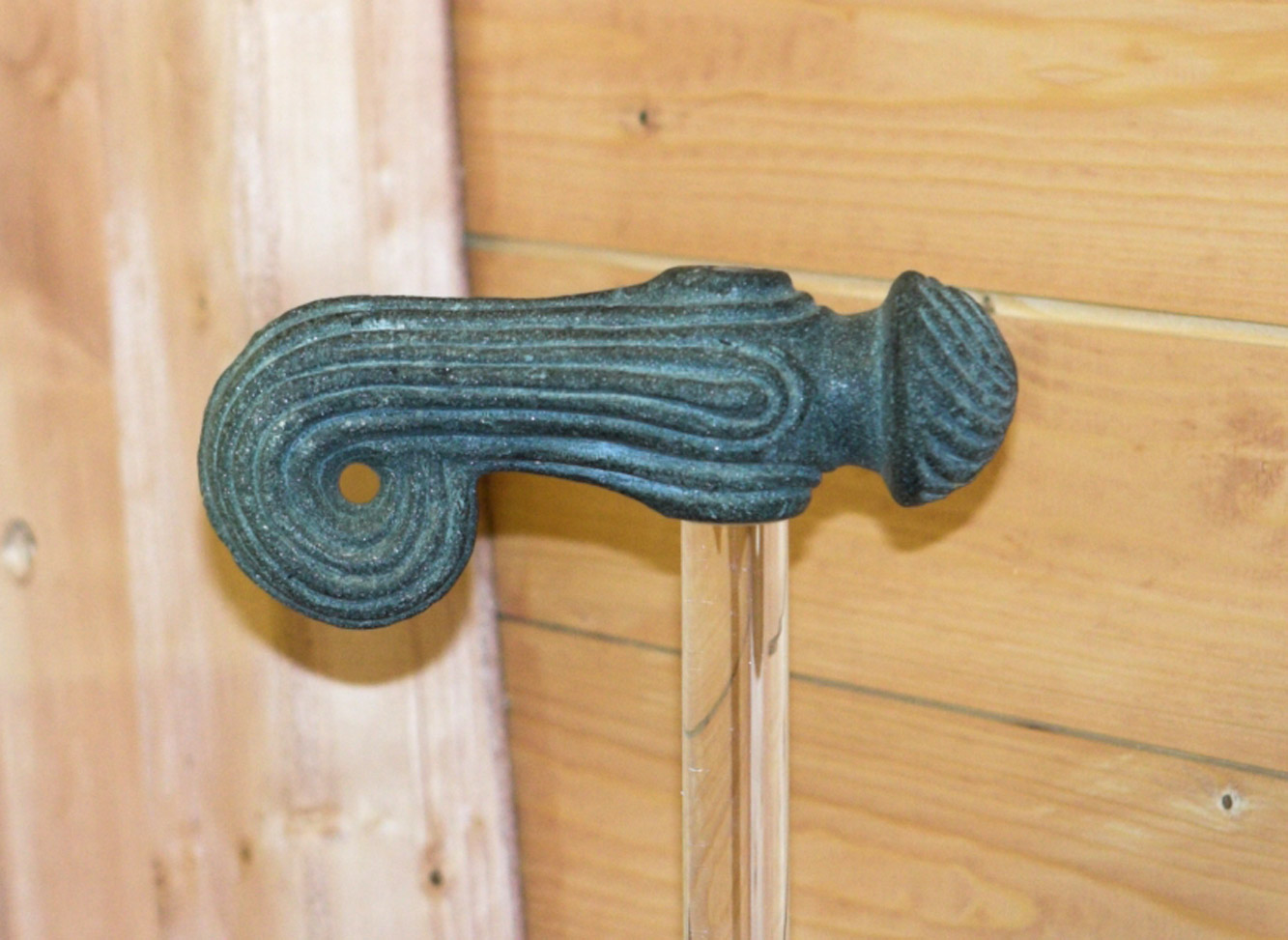
Mace or scepter head of northern Balkan origin.

=== Trade and/or diplomacy ===
The purpose of the expedition has given rise to numerous interpretations, falling into two categories: those favoring a diplomatic motive and those favoring a commercial one. The lack of clear evidence leaves the door open to multiple variations on these two approaches. Eric H. Cline even considers that there is "no shortage of possible scenarios."

Diplomacy in the ancient Near East is particularly well documented by written sources from the Late Bronze Age, primarily the Amarna Letters, which cover a period around 1360-1330 BC, thus shortly before the Uluburun shipwreck. The exchange of gifts between royal courts was an essential element of international relations during this period. It was marked by considerations of prestige and reciprocity, since in theory the gifts offered and received had to be of equivalent value in order to avoid offending either party, if they considered themselves equals. But they also served material and economic interests, giving them a transactional aspect, as raw materials desired by the recipient were often offered at their express request, when they did not have them at their disposal, particularly copper and gold. As for documented long-distance trade, it often appears to have a distinctly "public" character. Indeed, the "merchants" acted more as intermediaries and agents of the courts than as independent agents acting solely for their own benefit. They conduct business for a patron and sponsor belonging to the palatial elite, and often to the very elite, i.e. the royal family. Even if the royal institutions (the "Palace" in ancient texts) probably did not control all of the economic activity in their territory, they were undeniably the main economic actor, by far the richest and most active. They were the main importer/exporter of goods, whether they did so through trade or diplomacy. Trade and diplomatic relations were therefore often intertwined and difficult to separate.

The cargo of the Uluburun ship primarily involved the supply of raw materials, especially metals, destined for the Aegean world, in order to make bronze objects. However, it is unique in that it also contained manufactured goods, including luxury items. Since these types of objects are those serving as gifts and merchandise in the Late Bronze Age written documentation, two main options present themselves for interpreting the motivation behind the ship's final voyage and the nature of its cargo: it could have been an "international" commercial venture, with goods purchased by merchants in one or more Levantine ports for the Mycenaean elite; or it could be a diplomatic mission taking place within the framework of official relations between kings, with goods gathered as diplomatic gifts from one or more courts of the Near East and Egypt destined for a Mycenaean ruler. And if we consider the fact that trade and diplomacy were often intertwined during this period, it is possible to envision a mixed situation: part of the cargo consisted of exchanges of gifts between courts, another part was intended for sale. And in any case, the intended recipient of the cargo should likely be sought among the palatial elite.

Among the proposed scenarios, the one put forward by the site's excavation team sees the Uluburun shipwreck as the remains of a vessel destined for a Mycenaean palace, chartered by a local king or at least member of elite, whether for diplomacy or commerce..

Among diplomatic interpretations, the possibility of a cargo of Egyptian presents has been repeatedly considered. The expedition could have been intended to offer gifts to a Mycenaean king in order to establish friendly relations, hoping to counter the rise of the Hittites, who were then adversaries of the Nile Valley kingdom. The ship would have been chartered by a Canaanite petty king on the orders of his Egyptian overlord, because the latter did not own ships capable of undertaking such a long and complicated sea journey. According to D. Collon, one of the cylinder seals found in the wreck, finely executed, could be a dynastic seal of the Levantine type, typically held by members of a royal family. She suggests that a prince or princess from the Levant might be en route to Mycenae as part of a diplomatic agreement or marriage, which would be consistent with the richness of the cargo.

Regarding commercial scenarios, it has been pointed out that, although the quantity and financial value of the goods gathered in the boat are consistent with what one would expect from gift exchanges between courts, this does not necessarily seem beyond the means of a merchant "firm" such as those identified at Ugarit for this period (where they often worked with/for the palace anyway). It has also been pointed out that no direct official relationship between a Mycenaean court and a Near Eastern or Egyptian one is identified with certainty in the Late Bronze Age textual documentation, which would weaken the diplomatic interpretation..

== See also ==
- List of surviving ancient ships
- History of money
- Zambratija shipwreck

== Bibliography ==
- Bachhuber, Christoph (2006). "Aegean Interest on the Uluburun Ship". American Journal of Archaeology. 110 (3): 345–363. JSTOR 40024547.
- Bass, George F (1986). "A Bronze Age Shipwreck at Ulu Burun (Kas): 1984 Campaign". American Journal of Archaeology. 90 (3): 269–296. doi:10.2307/505687. JSTOR 505687. S2CID 192966981.
- Goren, Yuval (2013). "International exchange during the late second millennium B.C.: Microarchaeological study of finds from the Uluburun ship". In Joan Aruz, Benzel, Kim;Evans, Jean M. (ed.). Cultures in Contact: From Mesopotamia to the Mediterranean in the Second Millennium B.C. New Haven and Londres: The Metropolitan Museum of Art / Yale University Press. pp. 54–61..
- Nantet, Emmanuel (2012). "L'épave d'Ulu Burun". Revue Égypte, Afrique et Orient (in French). 64: 29–40..
- Pulak, Cemal (1988). "The Bronze Age Shipwreck at Ulu Burun, Turkey: 1985 Campaign". American Journal of Archaeology. 92 (1): 1–37. doi:10.2307/505868. JSTOR 505868. S2CID 191374689.
- Pulak, Cemal (1998). "The Uluburun Shipwreck: An Overview". The International Journal of Nautical Archaeology. 27 (3): 188–224. doi:10.1111/j.1095-9270.1998.tb00803.x.
- Pulak, Cemal (2005). "Discovering a Royal Ship from the Age of King Tut: Uluburun, Turkey". In Bass, George F. (ed.). Beneath the Seven Seas. New York: Thames & Hudson. pp. 34–47.
- Pulak, Cemal (2008). "The Uluburun Shipwreck and Late Bronze Age Trade" (PDF). In Aruz, Joan; Benzel, Kim; Evans, Jean M. (ed.). Beyond Babylon: Art, Trade, and Diplomacy in the Second Millennium B.C. New York. pp. 289–310.
- Pulak, Cemal (2010). "Uluburun Shipwreck". In Cline, Eric H. (ed.). The Oxford handbook of the Bronze Age Aegean (ca.3000– 1000 BC). Oxford: Oxford University Press. pp. 862–876..
- Pulak, Cemal (2015). "Uluburun (shipwreck)". Reallexikon der Assyriologie und Vorderasiatischen Archäologie. Vol. XIV. pp. 311–314..
- Sauvage, Caroline (2017). "The development of maritime exchange in the Bronze Age Eastern Mediterranean". In de Souza, Philippe; Arnaud, Pascal (ed.). The Sea in History. The Ancient World/La mer dans l'Histoire. L'Antiquité. Woodbridge: The Boydell Press. pp. 151–164.

=== Further reading ===
- Bass, George F. (December 1987). "Oldest Known Shipwreck Reveals Splendors of the Bronze Age". National Geographic. Vol. 172, no. 6. pp. 692–733. ISSN 0027-9358. OCLC 643483454.
- Bass, George F.; et al. (1989). "The Bronze Age Shipwreck at Ulu Burun: 1986 Campaign". American Journal of Archaeology. 93 (1): 1–29. doi:10.2307/505396. JSTOR 505396. S2CID 191385695.
- Fawcett, N.; Zietsman, J.C. (2001). "Uluburun - the discovery and excavation of the world's oldest known shipwreck". Akroterion. 46: 5–20. doi:10.7445/46-0-116.
- Jackson, C. M.; Nicholson, P. (2010). "The provenance of some glass ingots from the Uluburun shipwreck". Journal of Archaeological Science. 37 (2): 295–301. Bibcode:2010JArSc..37..295J. doi:10.1016/j.jas.2009.09.040. ISSN 0305-4403.
- Mumford, Gregory D. "Mediterranean Area". The Oxford Encyclopedia of Ancient Egypt. Ed. Donald B. Redford. Oxford University Press, Inc. 2001, 2005.
- Nicholson, Paul T.; Jackson, Caroline M.; Trott, Katherine M. (1997). "The Ulu Burun Glass Ingots, Cylindrical Vessels and Egyptian Glass". Journal of Egyptian Archaeology. 83: 143–153. doi:10.2307/3822462. JSTOR 3822462.
- Payton, Robert (1991). "The Ulu Burun Writing-Board Set". Anatolian Studies. 41: 99–106. doi:10.2307/3642932. JSTOR 3642932. S2CID 129794402.
- Ward, Cheryl (2003). "Pomegranates in Eastern Mediterranean Contexts during the Late Bronze Age". World Archaeology. 34 (3): 529–541. doi:10.1080/0043824021000026495. S2CID 161775993.
- Yalcin, Ünsal; Pulak, Cemal; Slotta, Rainer (eds) (2005). Das Schiff von Uluburun – Welthandel vor 3000 Jahren [The ship of Uluburun - world trade 3000 years ago]. Veröffentlichungen aus dem Deutschen Bergbau-Museum Bochum, vol. 138. Bochum: Deutsches Bergbaumuseum, ISBN 3-937203-18-4.
