= Deir el-Balah sarcophagi =

Bronze Age pottery coffins from Gaza

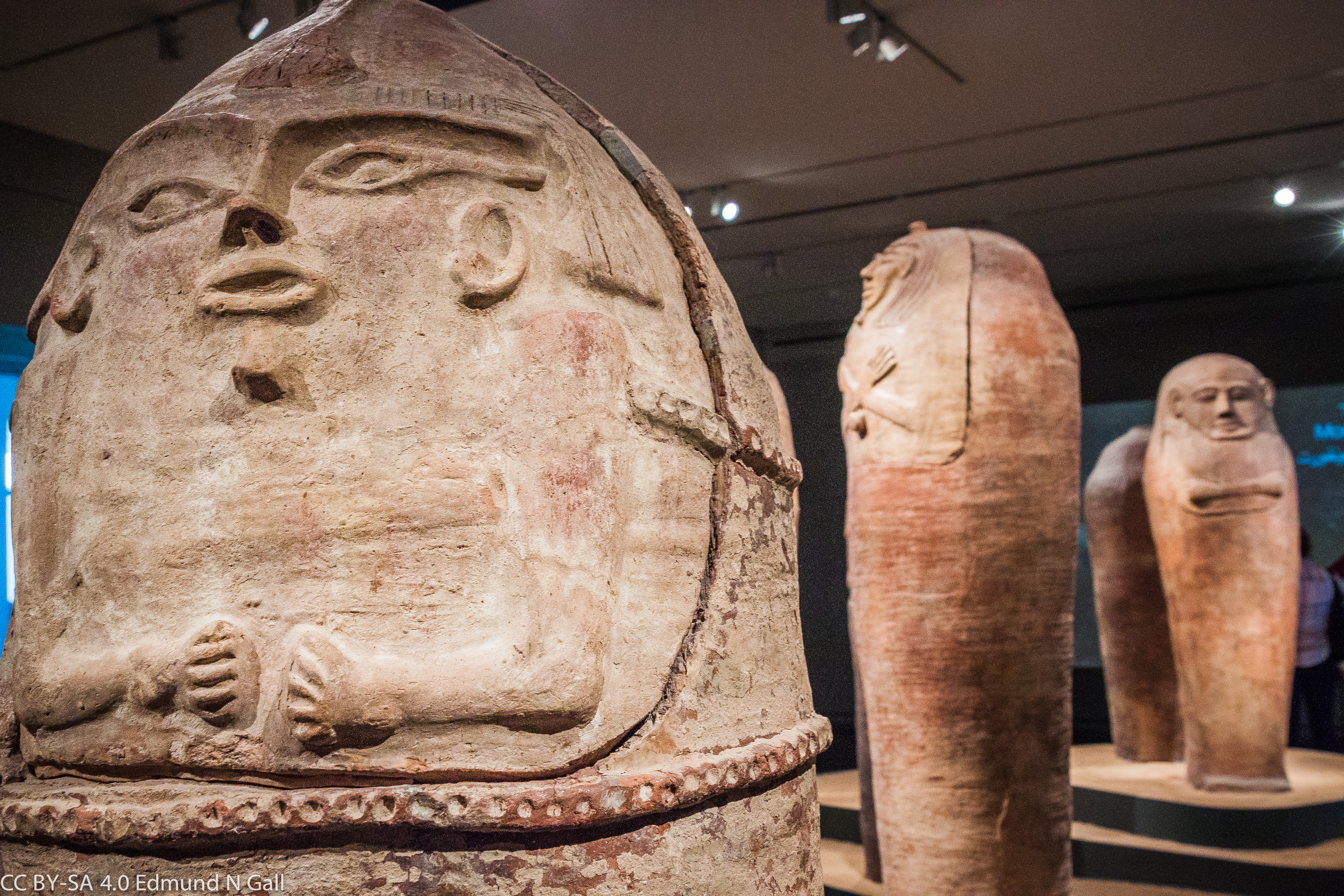
Some of the sarcophagi are on display at the Israel Museum in Jerusalem.

The Deir el-Balah anthropoid sarcophagi are pottery coffins created in the Bronze Age and discovered in the 1960s and 1970s. Around fifty anthropoid sarcophagi have been recovered from a cemetery in Deir el-Balah in the Gaza Strip that was used mainly in the 13th century BCE and perhaps a century before or after. The sarcophagi are between 1.6 and 2.0 metres (5 ft 3 in and 6 ft 7 in) tall; they were created locally and influenced by Egyptian styles.

Many of the coffins were looted by Moshe Dayan before the cemetery was excavated by Trude Dothan and Itzhaq Beit-Arieh. Some of the sarcophagi have ended up in the Israel Museum, the Hecht Museum, the Bible Lands Museum, and the Jordan Archaeological Museum.

== Discovery ==
Following the Six-Day War in 1967, the Israeli military took control of the Gaza Strip. General Moshe Dayan looted various archaeological sites in the aftermath of the war, including a Bronze Age cemetery at Deir el-Balah. The cemetery was found by a local farmer while clearing sand dunes. The farmer contacted Dayan due to his reputation for acquiring antiquities. Artefacts from the cemetery ended up on the antiquities market and drew the attention of archaeologist Trude Dothan who visited the site of the discoveries in 1968.

Moshe Dayan carried out illegal digging at 35 known locations and was most active in the 1960s and 1970s. Around 40 anthropoid coffins were illicitly removed from the cemetery at Deir el-Balah before the first scientific excavations by archaeologists were carried out in 1972. Many became part of Dayan's private collection. Staff from the Israel Museum restored some of the coffins and in exchange Dayan gave two to the museum. In the early 1970s the museum bought a further eight coffins from Dayan. The archaeologist Raz Kletter described Dayan as "a robber of antiquities, who had never acquired nor showed the slightest interest in acquiring scientific knowledge, such as methods of excavation, dating, stratigraphy, etc."

The 1954 Hague Convention for the Protection of Cultural Property in the Event of Armed Conflict prohibits excavations in occupied territories except for salvage excavations. A salvage excavation jointly led by Trude Dothan and Itzhaq Beit-Arieh began at the cemetery in 1972.

Dayan died in 1981 and his widow sold his collection of antiquities to the Israel Museum the following year for US$1 million; Husband and wife Laurence and Wilma Tisch contributed $900,000 towards the purchase, and Reuben Hecht and Leon Fiszman $50,000 each. The acquisition prompted debate about the ethics of purchasing illegally obtained antiquities. The collection included 23 of the sarcophagi from Deir el-Balah. The Israel Museum inaugurated an exhibition of items from the Dayan collection, including the sarcophagi, in May 1986, leading to protests about the acquisition of the exhibits. Ya'akov Meshorer, who curated the exhibition, said that "not purchasing the collection would have been a bigger crime than purchasing it".

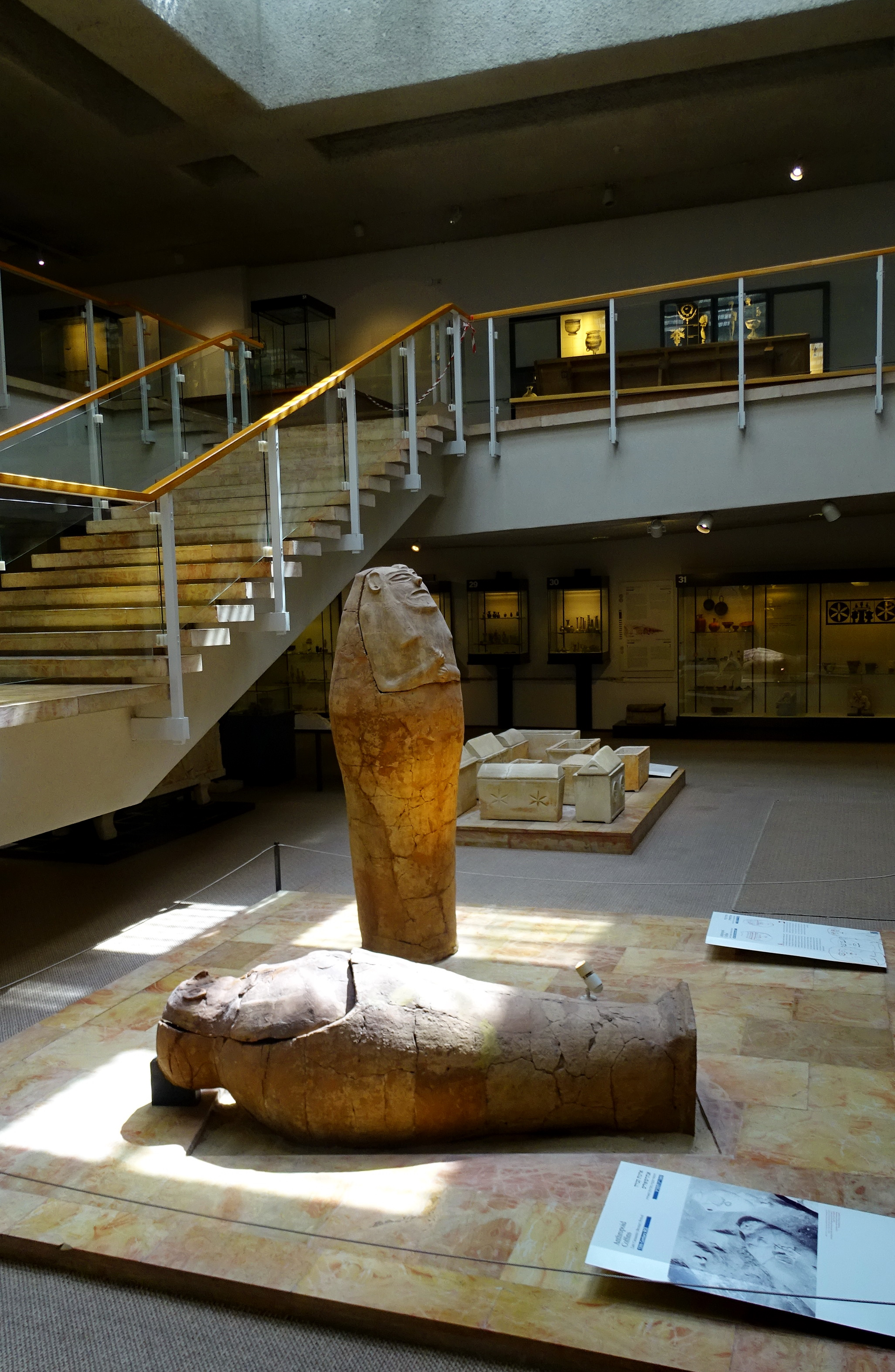
The two sarcophagi at the Hecht Museum were previously part of Moshe Dayan's private collection.

In recognition of Reuben Hecht's financial support in acquiring the sarcophagi, in 1986 the Israel Museum gave one sarcophagus to the Hecht Museum in Haifa and loaned it a second. The two sarcophagi were put on permanent display. Sarcophagi from Deir el-Balah are also in the collections of the Bible Lands Museum in Jerusalem and the Jordan Archaeological Museum in Amman. In 2003 an anthropoid coffin lid from Deir el-Balah was one of two items from Dayan's collection auctioned in Tel Aviv. The sarcophagi were part of a special exhibition, The Beauty of Sanctity, at the Israel Museum celebrating its 40th anniversary.

== Description ==
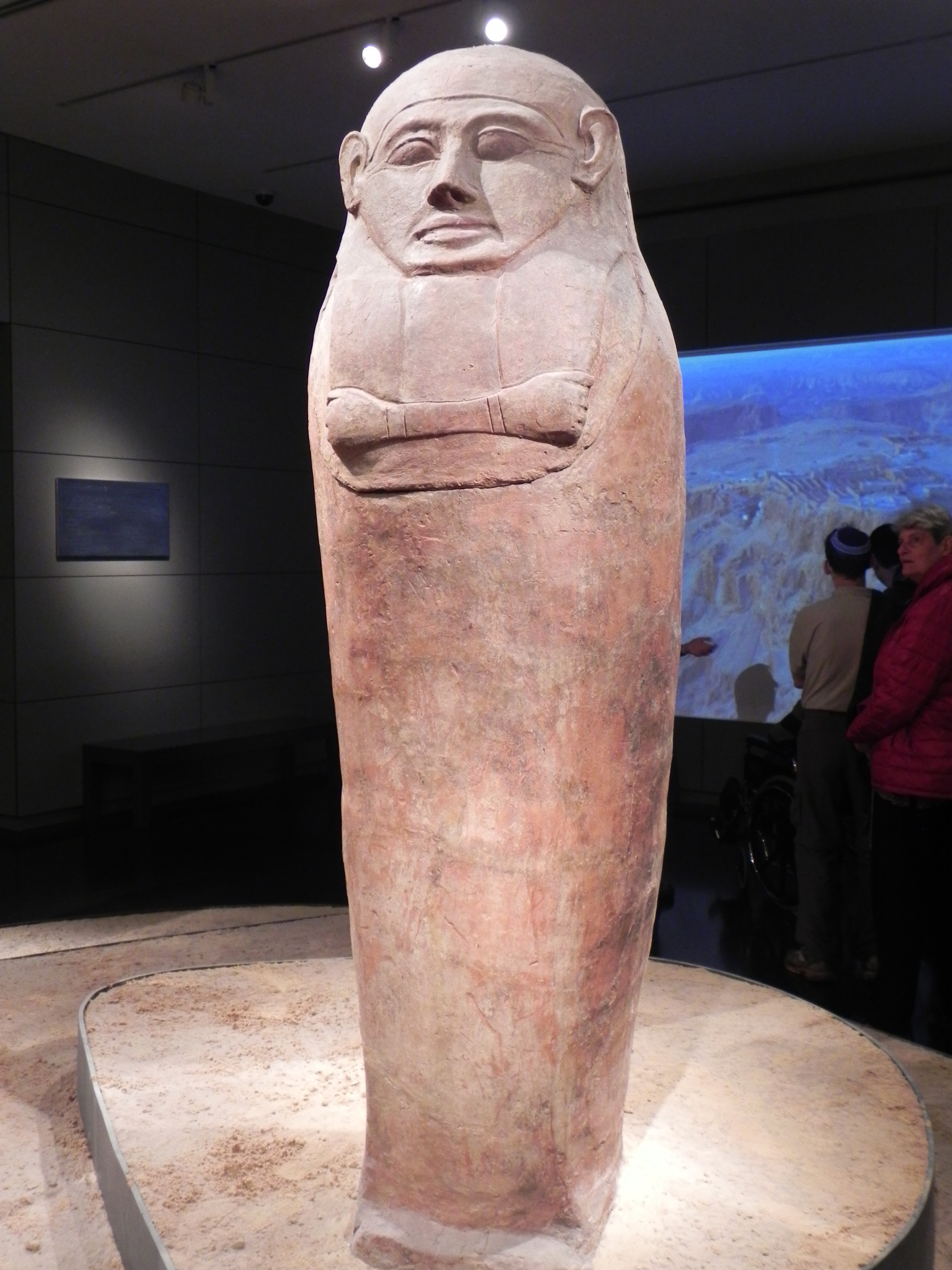
One of the sarcophagi (IMJ 82.2.834) stands 1.9 metres (6 ft 3 in) tall.

The cemetery may have been established in the 14th century BCE and was mainly used in the 13th century BCE. Its use may have continued into the 12th century BCE. During the period the cemetery was in use, the region was controlled by New Kingdom of Egypt. The sarcophagi were locally produced and influenced by Egyptian funerary art. There was a contemporary settlement nearby. Dothan hypothesised that this settlement may have been for the artisans who made the sarcophagi and the cemetery was used by multiple settlements spread over a large area. Though the cemetery's southern limit was established, the full extent of the cemetery is uncertain and it may cover an area between 3 and 4 hectares (7 and 10 acres). Some fifty burials have been identified at the cemetery.

The practice of using anthropoid sarcophagi for burials began in Egypt and was later adopted by the Philistines. The anthropoid sarcophagi found at Deir el-Balah are between 1.6 and 2.0 metres (5 ft 3 in and 6 ft 7 in) tall. The main parts of the sarcophagi were typically fired at lower temperatures than the lids, making the former more fragile. The main parts of the sarcophagi were formed by coiling clay. The lids were decorated with human faces in different styles, some in relief and some more pronounced. The most common design at Deir el-Balah includes the shoulders as well as the head, a design previously unknown in the region.

== See also ==
- Saved Treasures of Gaza: 5000 Years of History – 2025 exhibition of artefacts discovered in the Gaza Strip from the 1990s onwards

== Bibliography ==
- Aarons, Leroy (1982), "The Dayan Saga—The Man and His Archaeological Collection", Biblical Archaeology Review
- Arie, Eran (2016). "Anthropoid coffins" (PDF). In Ben-Tor, Daphna (ed.). Pharaoh in Canaan: The Untold Story. Israel Museum. pp. 97–100.
- Arie, Eran (2021). "Thirty years later: the Dayan Collection at the Israel Museum, Jerusalem". In Gáldy, Andrea M.; Sorek, Ronit; Assaf, Netta; Ventura, Gal (eds.). Collecting and Provenance. Cambridge Scholars Publishing. pp. 13–22. ISBN 978-1-5275-6713-9.
- Beit-Arieh, Itzhaq (1985). "Further Burials from the Deir el-Balah Cemetery". Tel Aviv: Journal of the Institute of Archaeology of Tel Aviv University. 12: 43–53. doi:10.1179/tav.1985.1985.1.43.
- Dothan, Trude (1978). Excavations at the cemetery of Deir el-Balah. Qedem. Vol. 10. Institute of Archaeology, Hebrew University of Jerusalem. JSTOR 43587093.
- Dothan, Trude; Beit-Arieh, Itzhaq (1972). "הפירות-הצלה בדיר אל-בלח" [Rescue Excavations at Deir el-Balaḥ]. Qadmoniot: A Journal for the Antiquities of Eretz-Israel and Bible Lands (in Hebrew). 17 (1). JSTOR 23666197.
- Dothan, Trude; Brandl, Baruch (2010). Deir el-Balah: Excavations in 1977–1982 in the Cemetery and Settlement: Volume I: stratigraphy and Architecture. Qedem. Vol. 49. Institute of Archaeology, Hebrew University of Jerusalem. pp. III–290. JSTOR 43588810.
- Friedler, Ya'acov (22 October 1986). "Clay coffins on view". The Jerusalem Post. p. 4. ProQuest 924058250 – via Proquest.
- Friedman, Thomas L. (14 May 1986). "Dayan legacy prompts dispute on antiquities". The New York Times. p. C.19. ProQuest 425878000 – via Proquest.
- Hachlili, Rachel; Meshorer, Ya'akov (1990) [1986]. חפצים נבחרים מאוסף מוזיאון ראובן ועדית הכט [Highlights from the Collection of the Reuven and Edith Hecht Museum] (in Hebrew) (2nd ed.). Haifa: Reuben and Edith Hecht Museum, University of Haifa. OCLC 745057106.
- Kersel, Morag M. (2015). "The Lure of the Artefact? The Effects of Acquiring Eastern Mediterranean Material Culture". In Knapp, A. Bernard; van Dommelen, Peter (eds.). The Cambridge Prehistory of the Bronze and Iron Age Mediterranean. Cambridge University Press. pp. 367–378. doi:10.1017/CHO9781139028387.027. ISBN 978-1-139-02838-7.
- Kletter, Raz (2003). "A very general archaeologist: Moshe Dayan and Israeli archaeology" (PDF). The Journal of Hebrew Scriptures. 4. doi:10.5508/jhs.2002.v4.a5. Archived from the original (PDF) on 3 December 2013.
- Kletter, Raz (2014) [2006]. Just Past? The Making of Israeli Archaeology. Routledge. ISBN 978-1-84553-085-3.
- Laflı, Ergün; Buora, Maurizio (2021–2022). "Terracotta sarcophagi from the eastern Mediterranean". Mediterranean Archaeology. 34/35: 83–116. JSTOR 48691685.
- Merlonghi, Marzia (2025). "Archaeology and shared heritage under occupation: the case of Israel/Palestine". In Sadowski, Mirosław M.; Bonaviri, Gianluigi Mastandrea; Ceccotti, Filippo (eds.). Heritage in War and Peace IV: Selected Strathclyde Papers. University of Strathclyde Publishing. doi:10.17868/strath.00093374. ISBN 978-1-914241-80-2.
- Seipel, Wilfried, ed. (1997). Land der Bibel. Schätze aus dem Israel Museum Jerusalem. Ausstellungskatalog Kunsthistorisches Museum Wien (in German). Skira. ISBN 978-3-900325-77-0.
