= Ya'akov Meshorer =

Israeli numismatist and classical archaeologist (1935–2004)

- יעקב משורר
- Ya'akov Meshorer
- Born: August 14, 1935; Jerusalem, Mandatory Palestine
- Died: June 23, 2004 (aged 68); Jerusalem, Israel
- Education: Hebrew University of Jerusalem
- Occupations: Numismatist, Archaeologist
- Known for: Chief Curator of Archaeology at the Israel Museum, Contributions to Jewish numismatics
- Notable work: Ancient Jewish Coinage (1982), A Treasury of Jewish Coins (2001)
- Spouse: Adaya Weiss
- Children: 2
- Awards: Huntington Medal (2001)
- Honors: Ya'akov Meshorer Numismatic Prize established in his honor (2002)

Professor Ya'akov Meshorer (Hebrew: יעקב משורר; August 14, 1935 – June 23, 2004) was the Chief Curator for archaeology at the Israel Museum in Jerusalem and a prominent Israeli numismatist.

== Early life ==
Known to colleagues and friends as 'Yankele', Meshorer was born in Jerusalem in 1935 into the prominent Mani family, who had lived in the area for centuries. He and his twin brother Asher used to find ancient coins as they played around the city, which was in the process of being built up. The 14-year-old twins donated the coins they had found to the Israel Department of Antiquities in 1949. He joined the Israel Defense Forces in 1954. After completing his army service in 1956 he became a member of Kibbutz Hazerim, where he married Adaya Weiss in 1956. Meshorer established a museum on the kibbutz before moving to Jerusalem in 1960, where he was a student at the Hebrew University of Jerusalem from 1960 to 1966, receiving a BA in archaeology and Jewish history and an MA in classical archaeology. He received his Ph.D in numismatics in 1971 from the Hebrew University. Meshorer served as a reservist in the Jerusalem Reconnaissance Company and in 1967 was slightly wounded in the Six-Day War. He later served as an officer in the UN liaison unit.

== Academic career ==
Meshorer was appointed Professor of Numismatics at the Hebrew University of Jerusalem in 1983. He established the Numismatic Division at the Israel Museum in Jerusalem in 1969, remaining at its head until 1993. He also served as the university's Chief Curator for Archaeology from 1975 to 1982 and from 1990 to 1996. He retired from the Israel Museum in 2000.

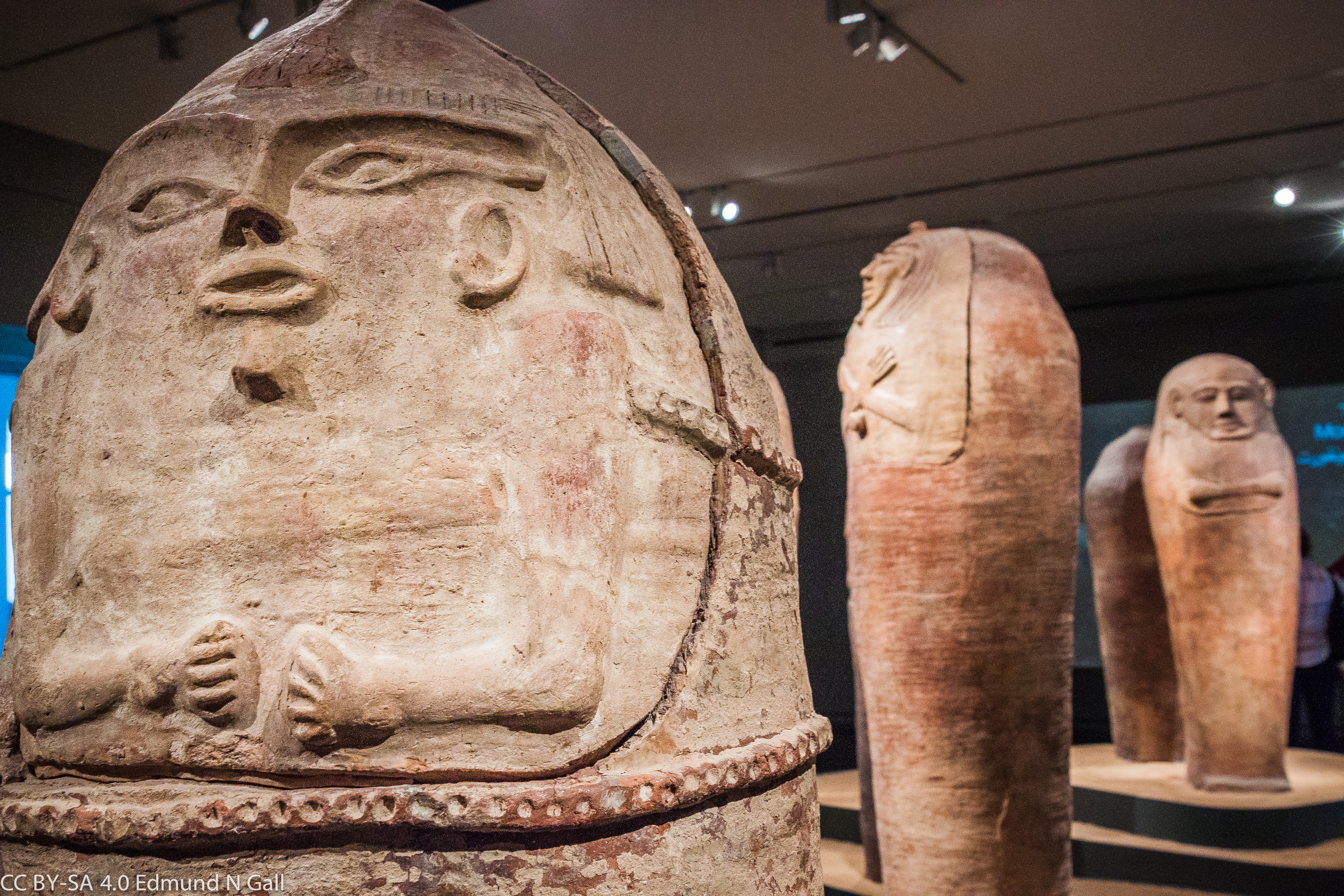
Meshorer curated an exhibition at the Israel Museum featuring the Deir el-Balah sarcophagi

Meshorer was a member of the Archaeological Council of the Israel Antiquities Authority and supervised the establishment of two museums devoted to Biblical Archaeology, the museum of the Cleveland Jewish Community Center in 1976, and The Hecht Museum at the University of Haifa in 1984. He was also a member of the Directorate of the Israel Society for Medals and Coins, serving on the committees that chose the design of the modern Israeli coins. He was instrumental in the decision to base the design of many of the modern coins on ancient Jewish coinage, in this way linking past and present in the State of Israel. Meshorer curated an exhibition at the Israel Museum displaying artefacts from the personal collection of Moshe Dayan. The exhibition was criticised as some of the objects, including the Deir el-Balah sarcophagi, had been illegally acquired.

He published 19 books and more than 100 articles, almost all of them dealing with the coins of the Holy Land.

== Honors and awards ==
Meshorer was invited to lecture and research at several major institutions, including the American Numismatic Society in New York City, Duke University, the British Museum, the Jewish Theological Seminary in New York, and the Bibliothèque nationale de France in Paris. Among the honors Meshorer received were the Huntington Medal of the American Numismatic Society in 2001, and in 2002 he was awarded the Irene Levi-sala Book Prize in Archaeology of Israel for his book ‘A Treasury of Jewish Coins From the Persian Period to Bar-Kochba’. He was elected an honorary member of the Council International Numismatic Commission at the opening of the 13th International Numismatic Congress of Madrid in 2003.

In 2002 a prize, the Ya'akov Meshorer Numismatic Prize, was established in memory of Meshorer at the Israel Museum; its first recipient was Dr. Andrew Burnett in 2002, and the second Michel Amandry in 2006.

Meshorer died in Jerusalem aged 69 after a six-year battle against cancer.

== Publications ==
- ‘A Treasury of Jewish Coins From the Persian Period to Bar-Kochba’, Yad Ben-Zvi Press, Jerusalem (2001)
- 'Coins of the Ancient World (Lerner Archaeology Series: Digging Up the Past)' Lerner Publishing Group (1980) ISBN 0-8225-0835-4
- 'A Treasury of Jewish Coins' Amphora Books (2001) ISBN 0-9654029-1-6
- 'Palestine-South Arabia (American Numismatic Society: Sylloge Nummorum Graecorum)' American Numismatic Society (1981) ISBN 0-89722-187-7
- 'City-Coins of Eretz-Israel and the Decapolis in the Roman Period' The Israel Museum, Jerusalem (1985) ISBN 965-278-036-7
- 'Coins of the Holy Land' American Numismatic Society (2006) ISBN 0-89722-283-0
- 'Jewish Coins of the Second Temple Period' Am Hassefer and Massada, Tel Aviv, (1967)
- 'Ancient Jewish Coinage Volume I: Persian Period Through Hasmonaeans' Amphora Books (1982) ASIN: B000MMINWI
- 'Ancient Jewish Coinage Volume II: Herod the Great Through Bar Cochba' Amphora Books (1982)
- 'TestiMoney' Amphora Books (2001) ISBN 965-278-256-4
- 'The Coinage of Aelia Capitolina' Israel Museum (1989) ISBN 965-278-076-6
- Ya'akov Meshorer and Shraga Qedar 'The Coinage of Samaria in the Fourth Century BCE' Numismatics Fine Arts International (1991)
