= Hecht Museum =

Archeological museum in Haifa, Israel

Coordinates: 32°45′48.52″N 35°1′4.72″E

- Established: 1984
- Location: Haifa, Israel
- Website: Hecht Museum

The Reuben and Edith Hecht Museum is a museum located on the grounds of the University of Haifa, Israel.

== History ==
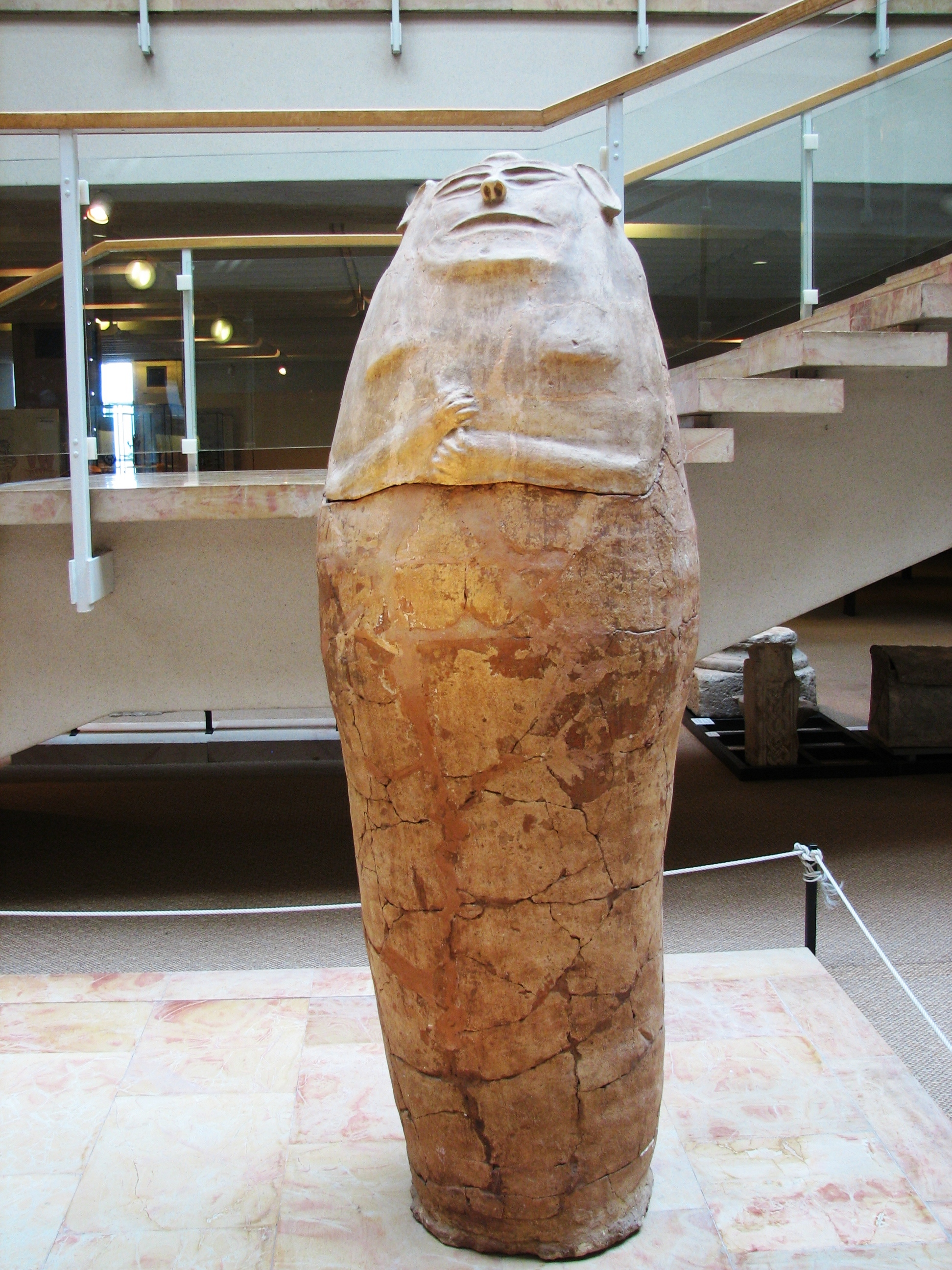
Late Bronze Age anthropoid coffin from Deir al-Balah (Gaza Strip).

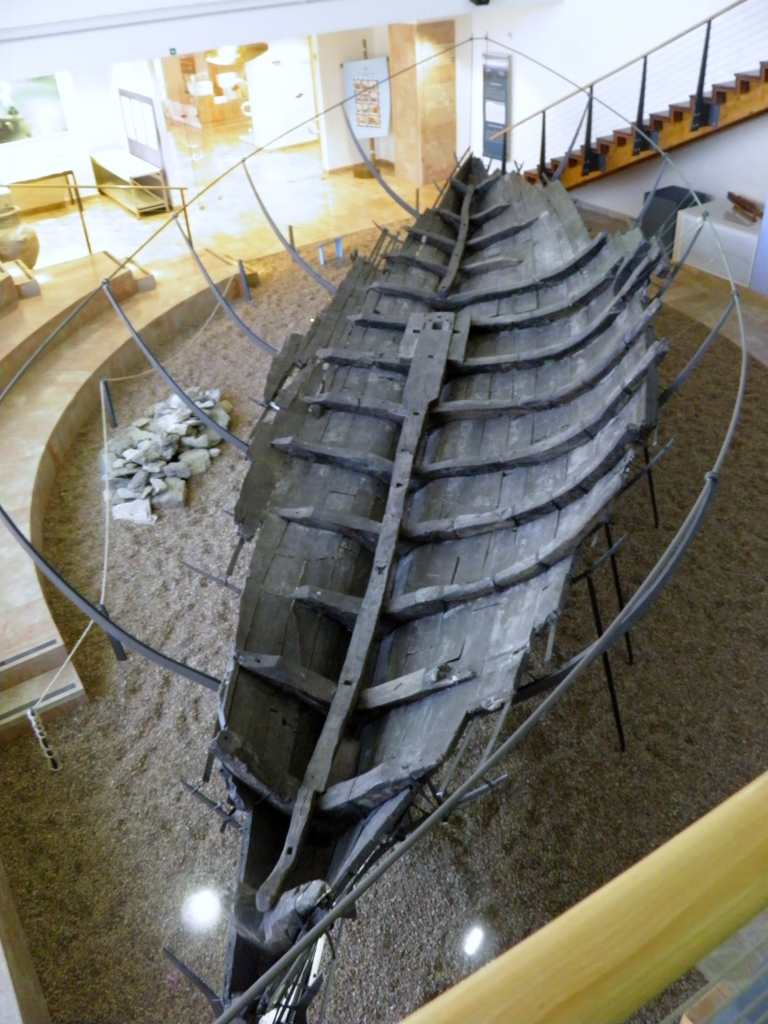
Ma'agan Michael boat

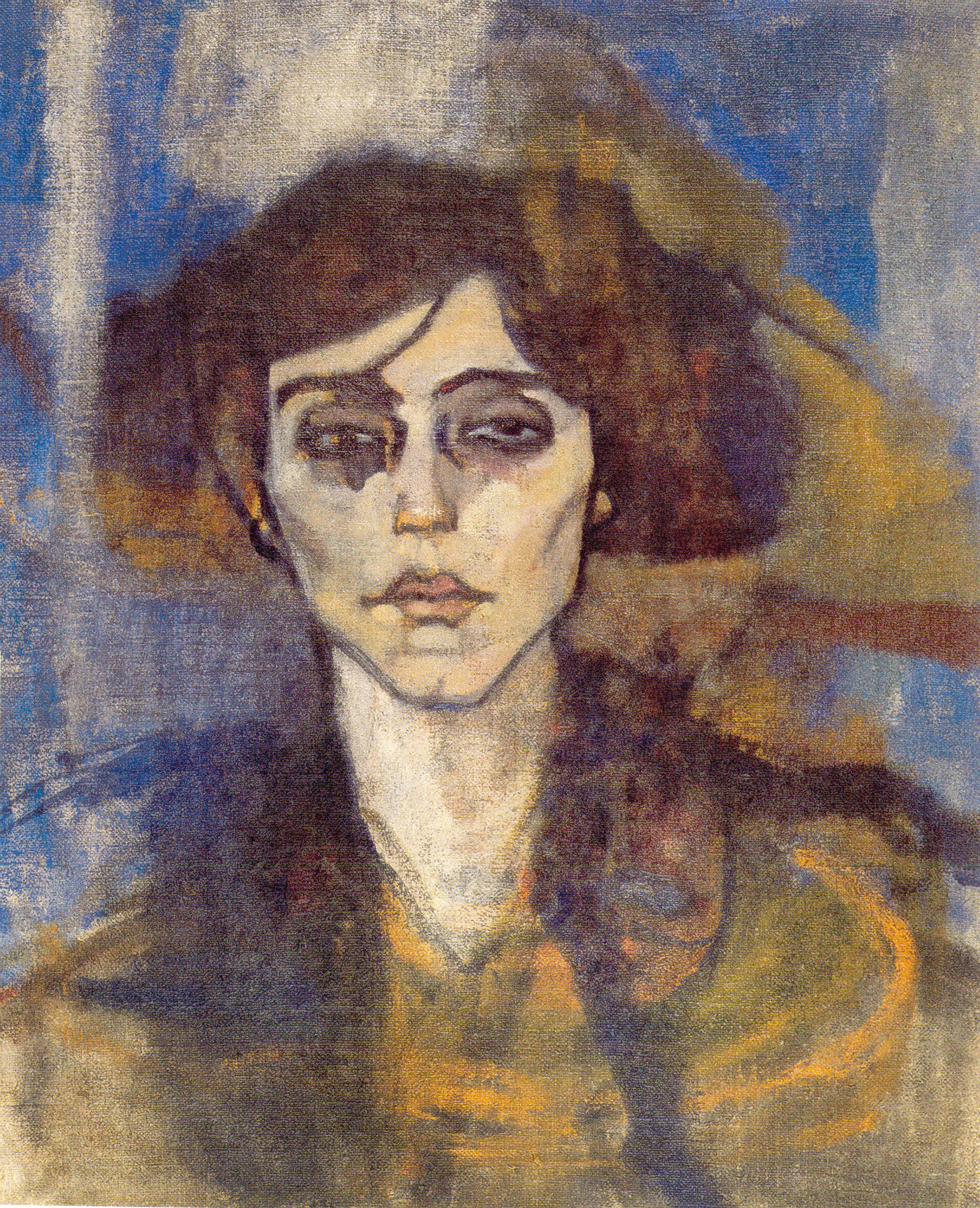
Amedeo Modigliani, 1907, Portrait of Maude Abrantes, oil on canvas, 81 x 54 cm

The Hecht Museum was established in 1984 by Reuben Hecht, director of Dagon Silos and a founding member of the University of Haifa Board of Governors. For sixty years, Hecht collected archaeological artefacts representing the material culture of the Land of Israel, canaanean and philistine civilizations in ancient times. He was particularly interested in finds from the Canaanite period to the end of the Byzantine period. Hecht believed that archeology was an important expression of Zionism and these ancient artifacts were proof of the link between the Jewish people and Eretz Israel.

In August 2024, a five-year old child accidentally pulled and smashed a 3500-year-old Canaanite jar dating back to the Bronze Age that was displayed without protection near the museum entrance. Despite the incident, the museum said that it would continue to display items without protective barriers "whenever possible", citing a "special charm" in showing archaeological finds "without obstructions". The jar was repaired and was redisplayed in its original position after two weeks.

== Exhibits ==
Exhibits display the archaeology and history of the Land of Israel in chronological sequence, from the Chalcolithic period to the Byzantine period. Exhibits include coins, weights, Semitic seals, jewelry, artifacts from the Temple Mount excavations; Phoenician metalworking, woodworking, stone vessels, glass making, and mosaics. The museum is also home to the Ma'agan Michael Ship, the wreck of a fifth-century BCE merchantman. The museum art collection includes French painting of the Barbizon School, Impressionism, Post-Impressionism, and the School of Paris, and Jewish art from mid-nineteenth to early twentieth century. The museum owns paintings by Jean-Baptiste-Camille Corot, Édouard Manet, Claude Monet, Camille Jacob Pissarro, Vincent van Gogh, Amedeo Modigliani, Max Liebermann.

== Activities ==
The museum has an acoustic auditorium that seats 380 and a pipe organ, built by Gideon Shamir from parts of organs used in churches throughout the country over a century ago. It also serves as a study center for students and academic researchers, offering enrichment studies in archaeology, art, Bible, and history for schoolchildren, soldiers, teachers and the public at large.

The Museum holds an annual art competition open to high-school students, soldiers, and fine arts students. Winners of the competition are granted scholarships by the Hecht Foundation, which also awards fellowships to M.A. and Ph.D. students in the Departments of Archeology and Maritime Civilizations. The Museum holds conferences, symposia, seminars, and lectures and publishes catalogs of its exhibitions of archeology and art.

== Journal ==
Michmanim, the museum journal, publishes scholarly articles on archaeological research and artifacts in the museum collection.

== See also ==
- List of Israeli museums
- Visual arts in Israel
