= Anthropoid ceramic coffins =

Ancient Egyptian burial customs

Anthropoid ceramic coffins of the Late Bronze Age Levant are coffins with human features that date from the 14th to 10th centuries BC. These coffins have been found at Deir el-Balah, Beth Shean, Lachish, Tell el-Far’ah, Sahab, and most recently in the Jezreel Valley in 2013. The coffins show Egyptian influence in the Ancient Near East and exhibit many Egyptian qualities in the depictions on the face masks on the lids. The lids can be separated into two artistic categories, the natural and grotesque, and the bodies are separated into type A, tapered from the shoulders, and type B, cylindrical. The graves contain wealthy funerary offerings from a variety of origins from Cyprus, Mycenae, Egypt, Phoenicia, and Canaan. The graves appear to be originally reserved for Egyptian officials and then later became a part of Canaanite and Philistine culture.

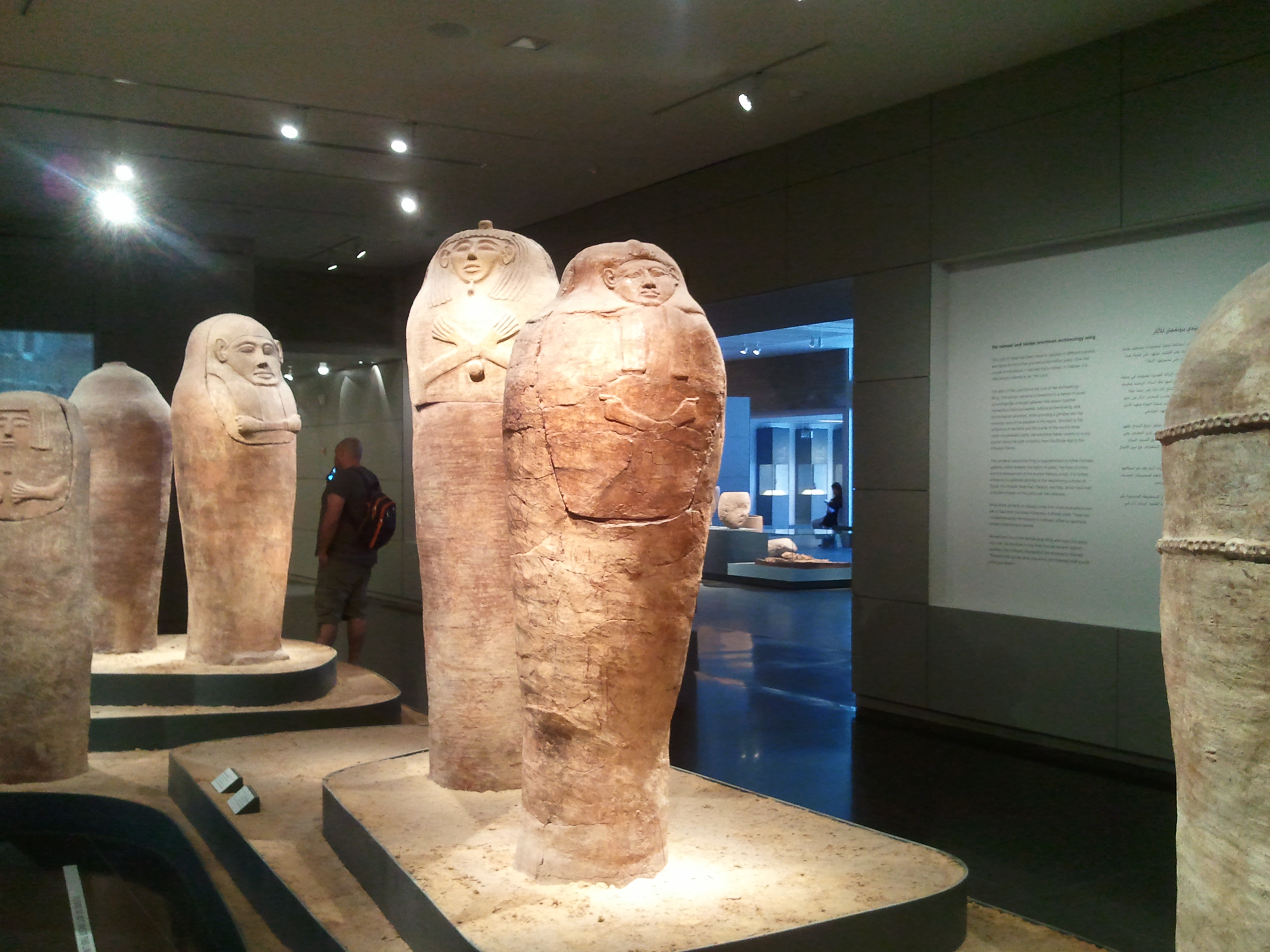
Anthropoid Clay Coffins from Deir el-Balah in Israel, now on display in the Israel Museum.

== History ==
The anthropoid clay coffins are generally believed to have been a product of the First Dynasty in Egypt that were gradually disseminated to other regions and peoples. They were one of several forms of burial practised by Sumerians at Ur and the Egyptians. There is some disagreement about the social and economic associations of this form of burial among scholars.

Burial customs used by the Egyptians include inhumation, clay coffins, and tombs with stairways and vaulting. Clay coffins are often associated with the poorest graves in Egyptian society, though not always in Levant.

In 1929 George Horsfield, Director of Antiquities for Transjordan, was alerted to the existence of a tomb near the city of Sahab. He notified W.F. Albright who personally visited the site. He describes the tomb as cistern-like and located on a hill [Albright 295]. He notes that the writing found here has no known identification, being dissimilar to both Semitic and Arabic. Albright describes his finds at this tomb as similar to findings at Beth-shan and Tell el-Far’ah, examined by Rowe and Petrie respectively. The objects found here are in stark contrast to those found at Canaanite tombs and are more closely associated with the Philistines. Generally, the findings suggest a date between the 11th and 12th centuries for the creation of these tombs.

In Egypt, Petries discovered several burials near Tell Nebesheh in 1885. As a result of the pottery he located here, he described the tombs as Cypriote and suggested that they were from the 5th to 7th century B.C. At Tell el-Yahuidiyeh in 1888, Naville discovered several tumuli tombs. He described the pottery he found as Cypriote because he thought it was similar to Petrie's findings. However, it was actually Canaanite in origin. A scarab found at this site dates to the 11–12th century. Some have suggested that the Philistines influenced the development of these sites, however it is more likely that they are a result of Egyptian influence.

In 1973, Trude Dothan described recent findings at the cemetery of Deir el-Balah in Canaan. Items found here can be said to have arrived from a variety of sources. However, there is evidence of strong Egyptian influence on local items as well as items imported from Egypt. This is the earliest site of anthropoid coffins in Canaan. There is speculation about the source of the development of anthropoid coffins at this site, but Dothan believes that the source is more likely Egyptian than Philistine. Items here date from the 11-13th centuries.

== Coffins ==
In a cemetery south of Deir el-Balah anthropoid coffins were found when locals were reclaiming sand dunes. The coffins were found among a few simple burials and when unearthed appeared to be in pristine shape, however they were actually being held together by the sand that had filled the cracks and was supporting the frame of the coffin from external pressure. In antiquity many coffins had fallen prey to grave robbers. These disturbed coffins, even though looted of their valuable objects, still hold a great deal of importance. Examining the coffins themselves proves to be of great value. In earlier times, at the end of the Predynastic Period and during the First Dynasty of Sumer and Egypt, clay coffins were imitations of ornamental wooden ones. Although most commonly found in single graves, at Tell el-Yahudiyeh there were many coffins placed next to one another in rows. These coffins were painted and plain, painted coffins are not commonly mentioned.

=== Ceramics ===
Local clay was used for the building of these coffins. Due to the large length, girth, and the weight it seems ideal for the construction to take place near the final burial place. Moving them long distances wouldn't have been feasible as the heavy clay would have been fragile. The material makeup of the clay has many impurities; rocks, sand, potsherds, and straw can be found in the shards. The inconsistencies in the property of the clay would not have been detrimental to the coffin’s stability, it would in fact have helped the structure. Rocks, sand, grit, and broken shards in the clay would have allowed for less stress on the form while it was drying. This stronger clay would have made the surface require more smoothing attention.

=== Construction technique ===
The coffins were coil built. This technique is done with large amounts of clay formed into coils and then layered upon one another with water or slip to act as a binder between layers. Large objects can be built in stages this way as a result of the lower sections being allowed to dry to support the continued additions of clay. Tapered at one or both ends. There is evidence that the lids were cut out of the forms after the initial building, to be reworked and molded; this would have been done at the leather hard stage when the clay was firm but still mailable. The facial features tend to be formed by molding with the clay that is part of the formed lid, with lids of the grotesque style applying more clay to the surface. Attention was paid most notably to the face lids, secondly to the exterior of the coffin, which was smoothed down and compressed back into itself. And lastly the interior was left rough and undefined with coils still notable. Some times handles can be found along the sides of the coffins, used for carrying as well as adapted and molded into representing the facial features on the lids. Handles seem to be one of the local variations of coffins; they are found in Transjordan and Beth-shan. The formations of the arms sculpted thinly along the edge of the lid are a conceptual representation and on a majority of the coffins they are not overly defined. There are instances of painted or scribed hieroglyphs on the exteriors of the coffins, though they are usually crudely rendered.

=== Completing and firing ===
The lids of the coffins are more often in better shape then the main bodies. The coffins found in Tomb 116 at Deir el-Balah have lids that are nearly intact while the bodies of the coffins, being fragile, broke easily upon excavation. The stability of the clay was determined by how it was treated and how it has been fired. More durable ceramic pieces had been fired to a higher temperature, allowing the clay to dehydrate and burn off all of the water that was mixed into it to create a malleable material to craft and mold. With the smaller face masks, where more time was devoted to sculpting, molding and carving the features, more care had been taken to ensure that they would last. "The coffins were fired in an open fire at a low temperature, which would account for the sometimes crumbly and mottled material."

=== Face lids ===
Face Lids fall into two categories, naturalistic or grotesque.

==== Naturalistic ====
Naturalistic Coffin Lids have a clearly shown face.

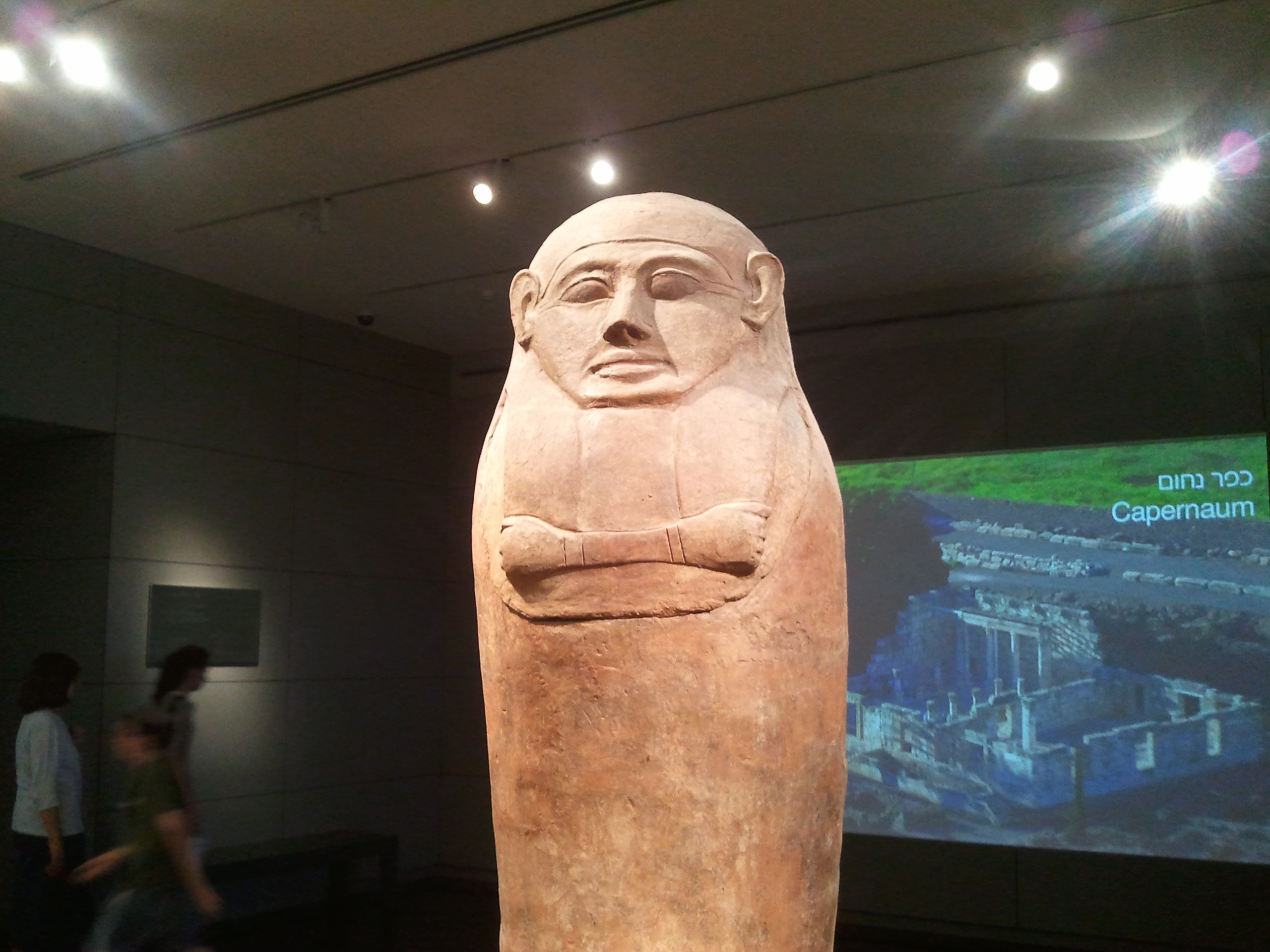
Anthropoid Clay Coffin with face lid and crossed arms. An example of a naturalistic face lid.

Naturalistic style coffins have well defined heads and facial features. These coffins are often molded in relief and have large Egyptian features, i.e. almond shaped eyes, arched eyebrows, straight noses, and full lips. The hair or wigs tend to be molded less sharply. The face lid of the coffins were molded separately and then later replaced upon the larger coffin, the shape of the lid hole also took into consideration the interning of bodies and is large enough for its purpose. Distinctive features are the high curved forehead, arched eyebrows and eyelid, broad turned up nose with deeply indented nostrils, plump cheeks, and protruding chin. Flat planes and consistent lines complete the face. Arms are often thin and stick like, crossed or holding objects such as lotus blossoms. The formations of the arms sculpted thinly along the edge of the lid are a conceptual representation and on a majority of the coffins they are not overly defined.

==== Grotesque ====
Grotesque Coffin Lids have no delineated facial outlines.

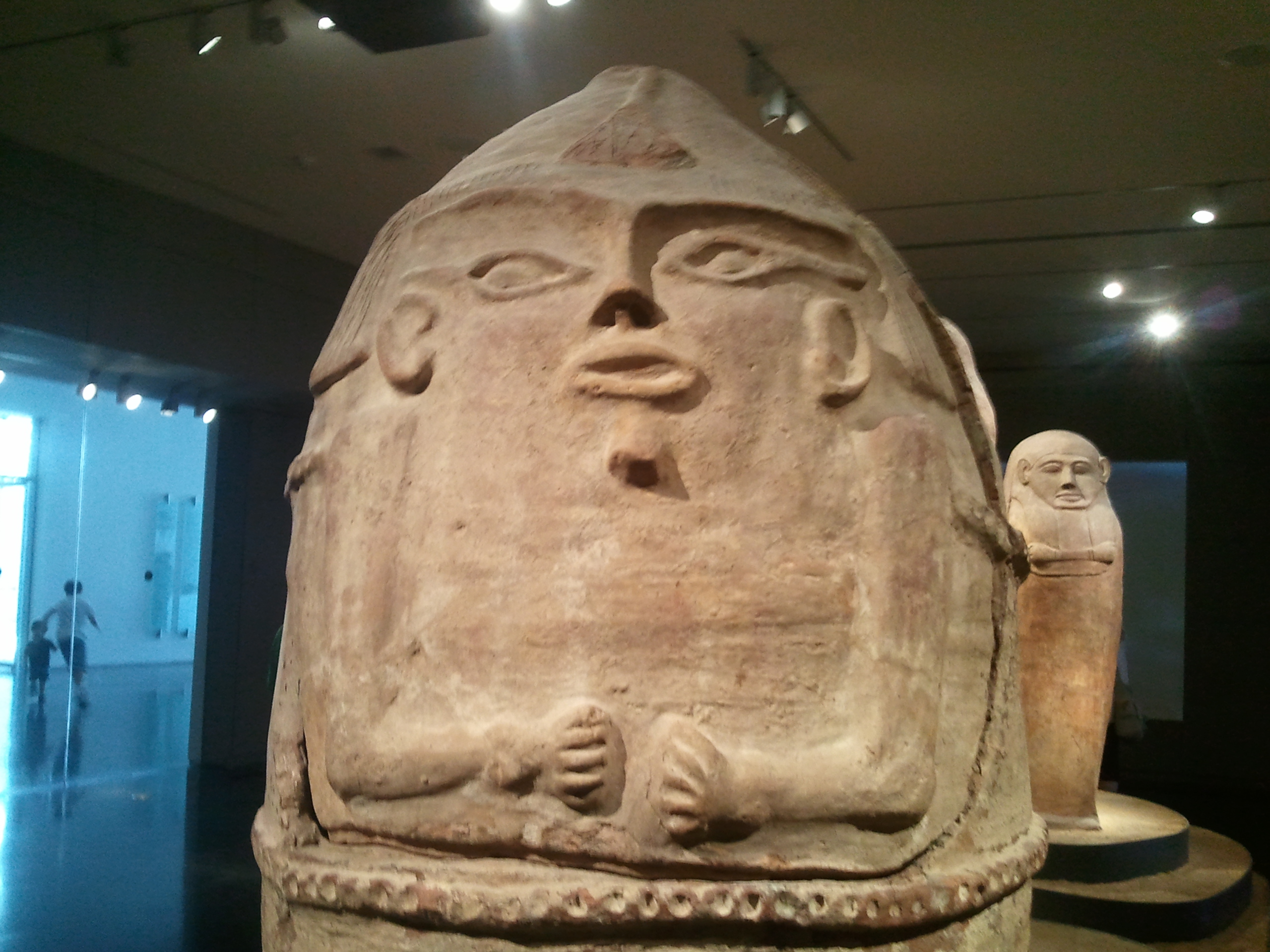
Anthropoid Clay Coffin with face lid and crossed arms. An example of a grotesque face lid.

Grotesque style coffins have eyes, eyebrows, nose, mouth, ears, and beard that have been applied separately to the leather-hard clay. This can be done with slipping and scoring that joins two separate pieces of clay together. "The fact that the lid is the face gives a bizarre, somewhat caricature-like effect." The grotesque lids are associated with the later coffins of the 11th-10th centuries BCE and the construction practices of the Philistines.

=== Coffin types ===
Typologically the coffins have been divided into two groups according to the outline of the lids and coffins. The groups are:

Group A

This style is the dominant shape at Deir el-Balah, it is mummy shaped with delineated head and shoulders in various proportions and silhouettes. The shape follows he traditional concept of Egyptian anthropoid coffins.

Group B

Cylindrical Coffins, or Group B, have a head and shoulders that are not delineated. There is sometimes a round opening at the top of the head with a molded pithos like rim, this can appear like the opening of a vase. This style can also have a round opening in the base. The bottoms of both the feet are outlined. The lid is small in proportion to the coffin.

=== Egyptian similarities ===
There are many similarities to Egyptian burials and iconography found in Near Eastern Clay Coffins. Coffins with face lids from Egypt’s poor have been dated to 18th and 19th Dynasties (ca. 1575-1200). Lotus flowers carved into head masks as a symbol of rebirth. The features of the face have visibly Egyptian, the slanting shape of the eyes, arched eyebrows, and representation of the hair and the wigs are the most notable. Roman coffins, from a later period then our Near Eastern coffins, are poor earthenware imitations. Both the Near Eastern coffins and those of the Roman’s are imitations of Egyptian style coffins with individual features being characteristic of the regions they were crafted.

== Burials ==
There were burials containing anthropoid ceramic coffins excavated at the sites of Deir el-Balah and Beth Shean predominantly, however there were coffins found in smaller numbers at Lachish, Tell el-Far’ah, Sahab, and the Jezreel Valley. Many of the excavated anthropoid ceramic coffins from Deir el-Balah were buried in similar ritual contexts dating from the 14th-11th centuries BC. The coffins were cut into a foundation of Kurkar (sandstone) or hamrah (red sand) and lined with rough stones and oriented to the west. The coffins at Deir el-Balah were marked with large pithoi at the head of the burial with dipper jugs inside and bowls on top serving as lids, these deposits served as the grave markers. At Deir el-Balah the coffins typically contained more than one individual and contained up to four people in some cases. At Beth Shean the coffins were placed into rock cut tombs also facing the west from the same time period as Deir el-Balah. The northern cemetery at Beth Shean contained roughly fifty coffins with surviving face lids. These graves had been disturbed in antiquity and the amount of information left was sparse. The coffins from Beth Shean were unique and were adorned with headdresses, which some have suggested to mean they are of Philistine origin. At Lachish and Tell el-Far’ah the several rock cut tombs found there containing anthropoid ceramic coffins date from a later period, 12th–10th centuries BC, and are mostly associated with Philistine offerings.

== Offerings ==
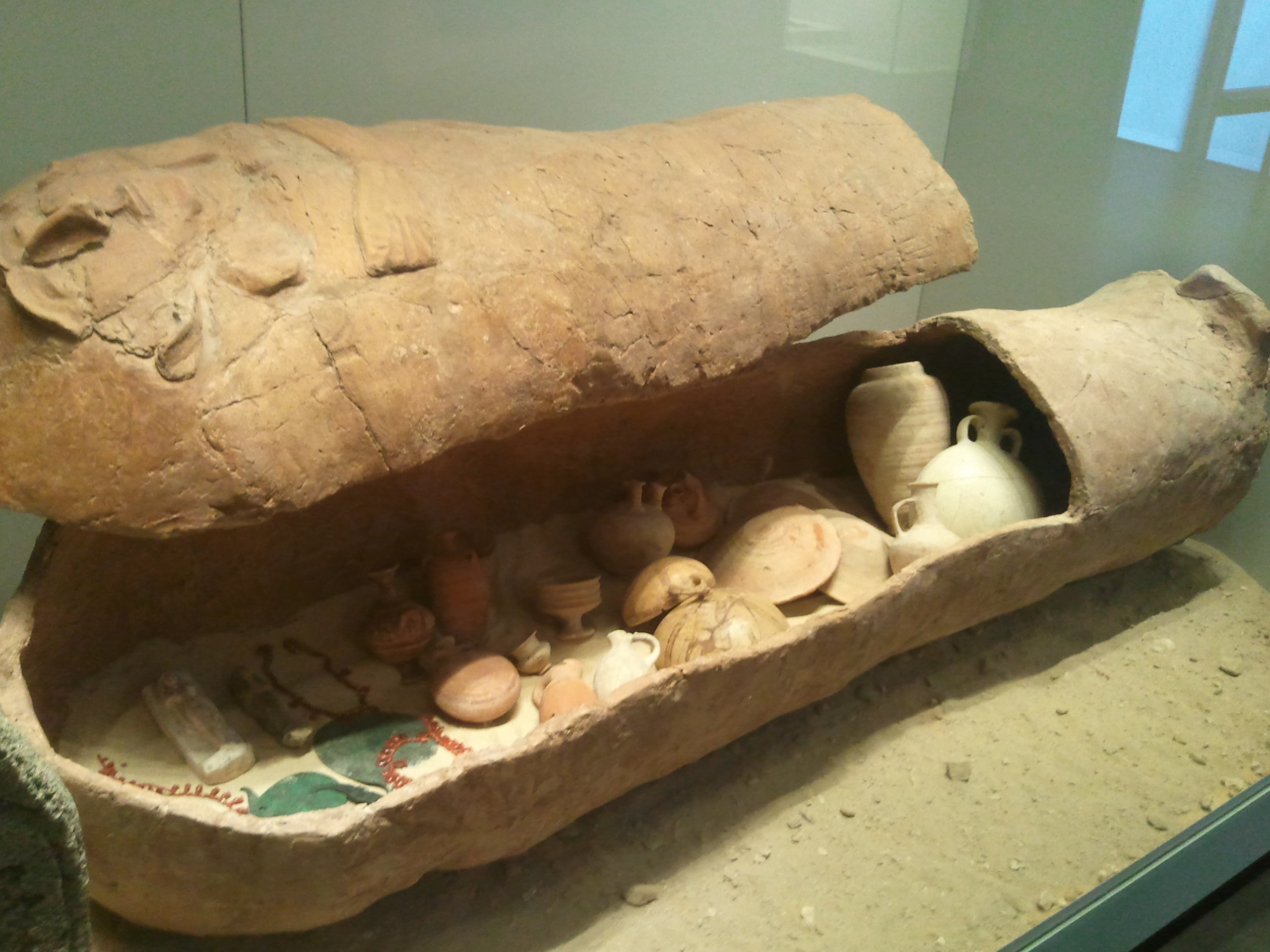
Interior of an Anthropoid Clay Coffin, ceramic vessels.

These burials were typically associated with a large variety of expensive grave offerings. The offerings consist of ceramics, bronzes, and jewelry of precious metals and stones. Wide ranges of ceramic offerings are found with the burials such as Cypriot, Canaanite, Egyptian, Mycenaean, and Philistine pottery. The pottery can be separated into two categories, that which is found within the coffin and that which is found outside of the coffin. The pottery found outside of the coffin is typically larger and of a more utilitarian variety, such as storage jars, pithoi, stirrup jars, and cooking pots. The pottery found inside the coffins is smaller and of a higher quality, including Cypriots milk bowls, Egyptian alabaster cups, pilgrim flasks, and juglets. The earlier burials (14th–12th centuries BC) were associated with more Egyptian influenced pottery and finds, whereas the later burials (12th–10th centuries BC) were associated with the Philistine culture.

Bronze tools and implements were another common burial offering associated with anthropoid ceramic coffins. The bronze items are usually Egyptian in style and consist of bowls, pitchers, knives, and in one case a wine set. The wine set consisted of a bronze pitcher and a strainer and is one of only a few complete sets found. In a rich coffin of a woman at Deir el-Balah an Egyptian New Kingdom style bronze mirror was found. Bronze was not the only type metal artifact found; in one of the tombs at Tell el-Far’ah one of oldest pieces of Iron in the Levant was found.

These anthropoid ceramic coffins appear to have been associated with wealthier individuals and consequently have a trove of expensive small finds. Many beads from necklaces and bracelets made of expensive materials were found inside the coffins. Golden beads in the shapes of palmettes and lotus blossoms were common and showed the incorporation of Egyptian and Near Eastern art motifs in the funerary adornment. Many of the beads found were made out of a semi-precious stone, carnelian. Another interesting find associated with one of the coffins at Deir el-Balah was a makeup spoon in the shape of a diving woman. This is a common motif found in Egyptian art of the New Kingdom period. One of the more important small finds associated with the coffins from all sites they were found at are scarabs. Scarabs bearing imagery and the cartouches of New Kingdom Pharaohs, including one of Rameses II, have been found in context with most of the coffins and suggest that the people buried in the coffins were possibly Egyptian officials.

== Conclusion ==
Most of the information known about these burials has been taken from the associated finds due to the lack of written evidence. Only on two occasions was there writing associated with the burials; the first, a badly preserved funerary stele lining a grave at Deir el-Balah and the second, a coffin lid from Lachish that had poorly written and preserved hieroglyphs on it. There are still some mysteries associated with these burials, one being sets of stone and bone pellets found inside many of the coffins. The use of the pellets has yet to be discovered. The biggest unknown still surrounding these coffins, that the offerings have helped to unravel, is who were the coffins made for. Scholars have suggested they are for Egyptians, Canaanites imitating the Egyptians, and the Philistines. From the dates associated with the finds, it appears that the coffins originated with Egyptians and Egyptian influence in Canaan and then was adopted by the Philistines later.
