= The Kyrenia Ship =

Ancient Greek merchant ship wreck

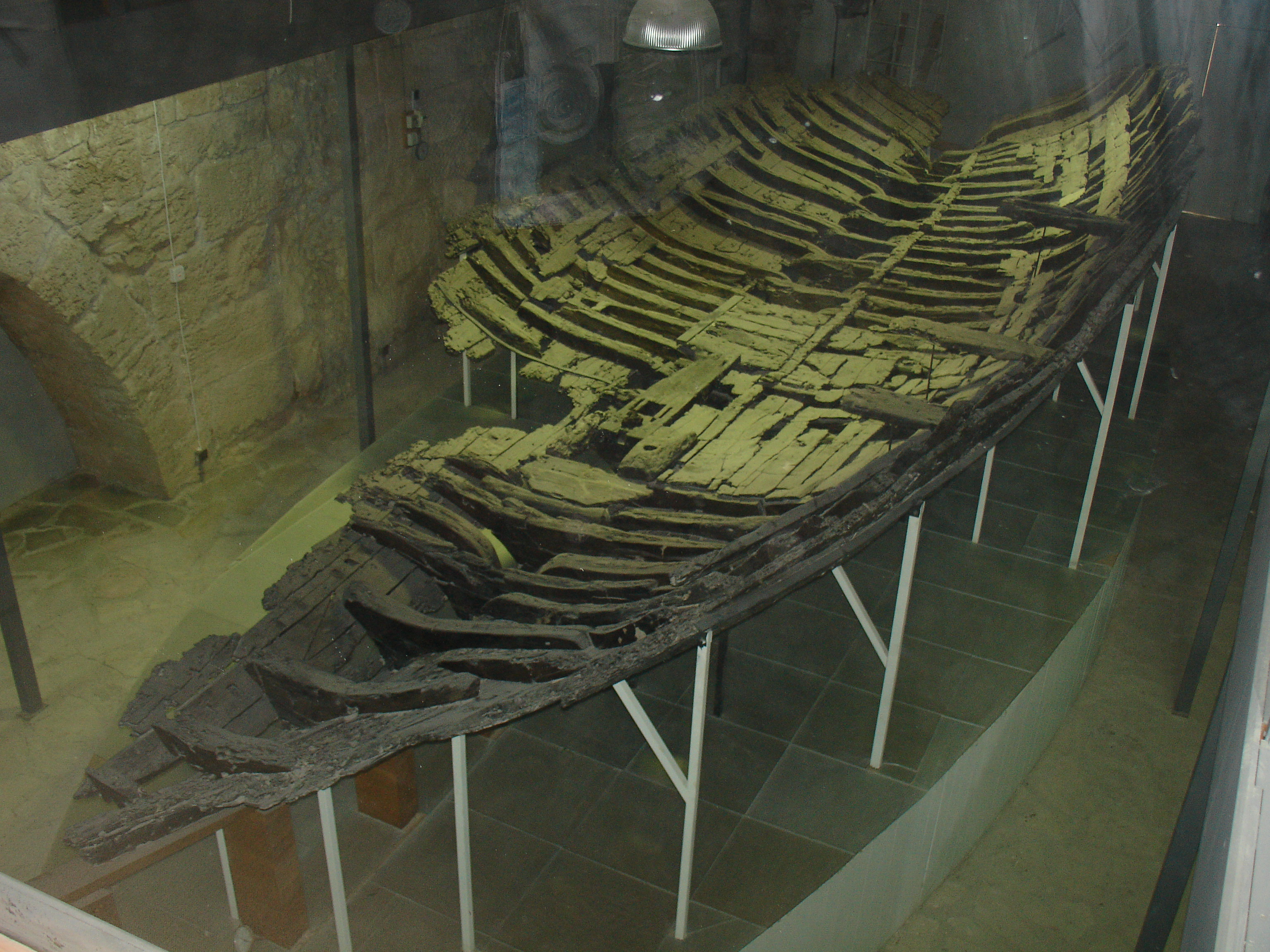
- The Kyrenia Ship

History
- Name: Kyrenia Ship
- Launched: c. 315 BC
- Fate: Sank, c. 294 BC
- Status: Museum ship

General characteristics
- Type: Trading vessel
- Length: 14 m (47 ft)
- Beam: 4.4 m (14 ft 6 in)
- Sail plan: Single square sail
- Speed: 4–5 kn (7–9 km/h)
- Crew: 4

The Kyrenia Shipwreck is a 4th-century BC ancient Greek merchant ship that sank c. 294 BC.

The Kyrenia wreck was discovered by Greek-Cypriot diving instructor Andreas Cariolou in November 1965 during a storm. Having lost the exact position, Cariolou carried out more than 200 dives until he re-discovered the wreck in 1967 close to Kyrenia (Keryneia) in Cyprus. Michael Katzev, a graduate student at the University of Pennsylvania Museum of Archaeology and Anthropology, directed a scientific excavation from 1967 to 1969. Katzev later became a co-founder of the American Institute of Nautical Archaeology. The find was extensively covered in a documentary by the Cyprus Broadcasting Corporation titled "With Captain, Sailors Three: The Ancient Ship of Kyrenia". The ship itself was very well preserved with more than half its hull timbers in good condition.

After it was raised from the seabed, it found a new home at the Ancient Shipwreck Museum in Kyrenia Castle, where it remains on exhibit.

== Career ==
The ship sailed in the Mediterranean during the lifetime of Alexander the Great and his successors. It sank in open water off the ancient harbour of Kyrenia some time after 294 BC, when it was rather old.

The ship was in use by merchants for more than 20 years. Archaeologists studied the ship's remains in detail and found much new information about ancient construction techniques, the re-use of materials in antiquity, and evidence of extensive repairs and modifications during the Kyrenia ship's working life. Planking was replaced and repaired in the bow. A break in the ship's keel had been mended, and the outside of the ship was protected with wooden and lead sheathing to keep the aging timbers water-tight and extend the ship's working life. Closer analysis of the rabbets in the hull's frame suggest that the mast step had been moved up to three, and possibly four times. This movement happens to be in close proximity with a space to collect bilge water. Because of this, archaeologists surmise that the movement of the mast step was to make way for a larger bilge sump, capable of lifting water out and overboard These extreme measures to deal with water infiltration corroborate the frailty of the ship and may have contributed to its sinking. The hull's excellent preservation, along with its extensive repairs, demonstrate its long sailing life and adds greatly to our knowledge of shipbuilding in antiquity.

== Discovery ==
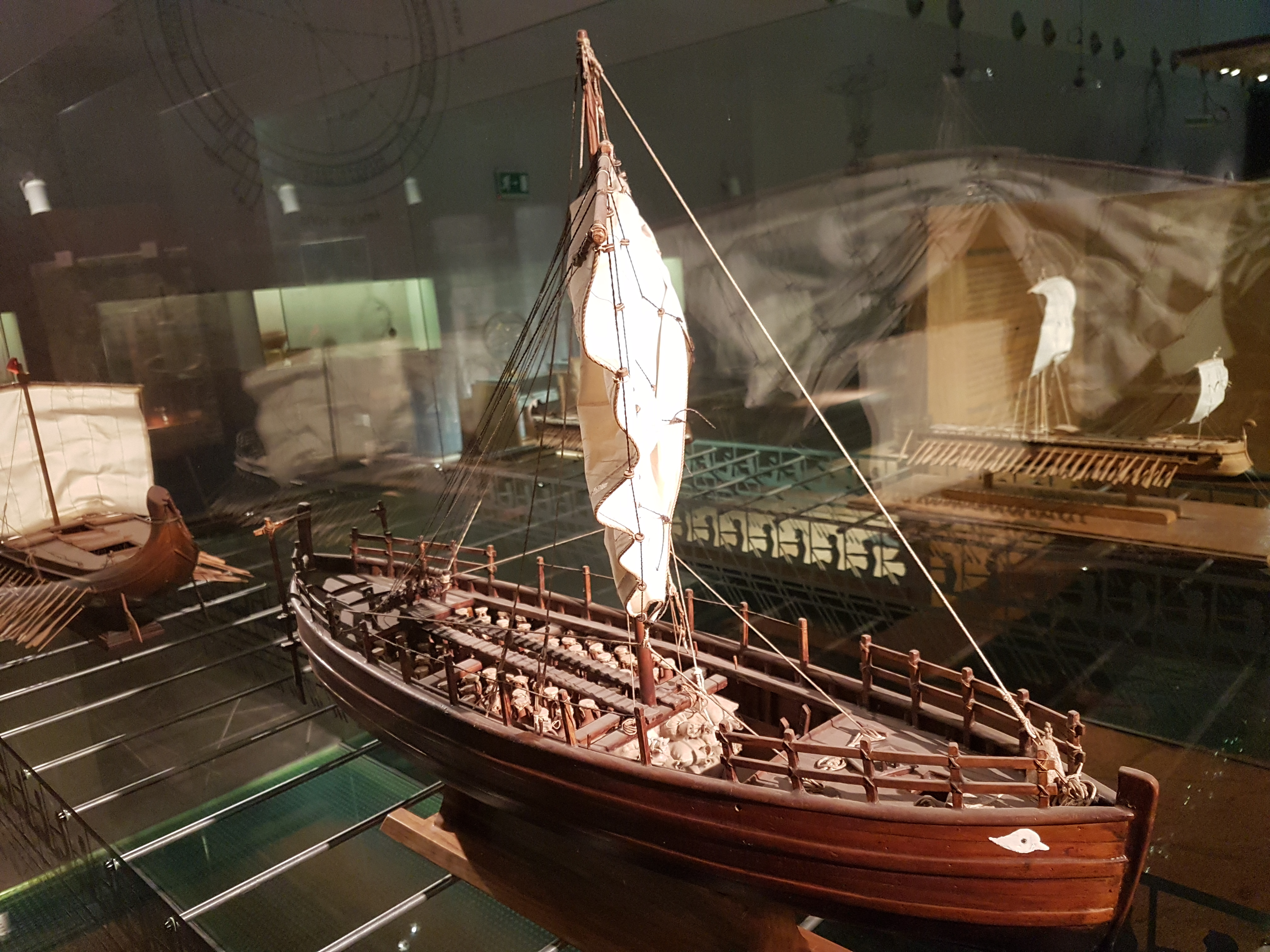
Ship of Kyrenia (model), Thessaloniki Science Center and Technology Museum

The shipwreck of Kyrenia was discovered in November 1965 by the Kyrenian Greek Cypriot diving instructor and Municipal Councillor Andreas Cariolou while collecting sponges at a sea depth of 33 metres, approximately one nautical mile (two kilometres) Northeast of the harbour of Kyrenia on the North coast of the Republic of Cyprus, during a stormy day. With the storm at the surface, the anchor of his vessel started to drag on the muddy seabed. Cariolou noticed the cloud of the drag and followed the anchor's slow travel when he suddenly noticed the shipwreck. Happily bewildered he had to quickly recover and follow the drag of his anchor as his vessel was dangerously approaching the rocky coast. Understanding the importance of his find and the risk of illegal excavations, he remained discreet about it informing only the director of the Department of Antiquities Dr Vassos Karageorghis and the President of the Republic of Cyprus. In late 1967, the Department of Antiquities of the Republic of Cyprus, invited a number of Underwater Archaeologists to study the possibilities of excavating at such a particularly difficult and costly sea depth. Amongst them was nautical archaeologist Michael Katzev of the University of Pennsylvania Museum of Archaeology and Anthropology who had been surveying for shipwrecks off the coast of Cyprus. In that year, Andreas Cariolou took the team headed by Michael Katzev to the site.

Michael Katzev directed the archaeological expeditions from 1967 to 1969. In 1967, a general inspection was undertaken which included a team of scientists from Oxford University (Dr Edward Hall, Dr Jeremy Green), using a "proton" magnetometer metal detector and probes. Green spent a month on the site to find metal parts and the approximate position of the entire ship and its cargo over an area measuring approximately 20 by 5 metres (66 by 16 ft). During the summers of 1968 and 1969, the shipwreck was excavated and a team of more than 50 underwater archaeologists, students and technicians employing stereophotography and other developed techniques to record the position of each object before they were brought to the surface. Then the ship's wooden hull which was well preserved on the seabed was recorded, photographed, labelled, dismantled and carefully lifted to the surface.

== Archaeological evidence ==
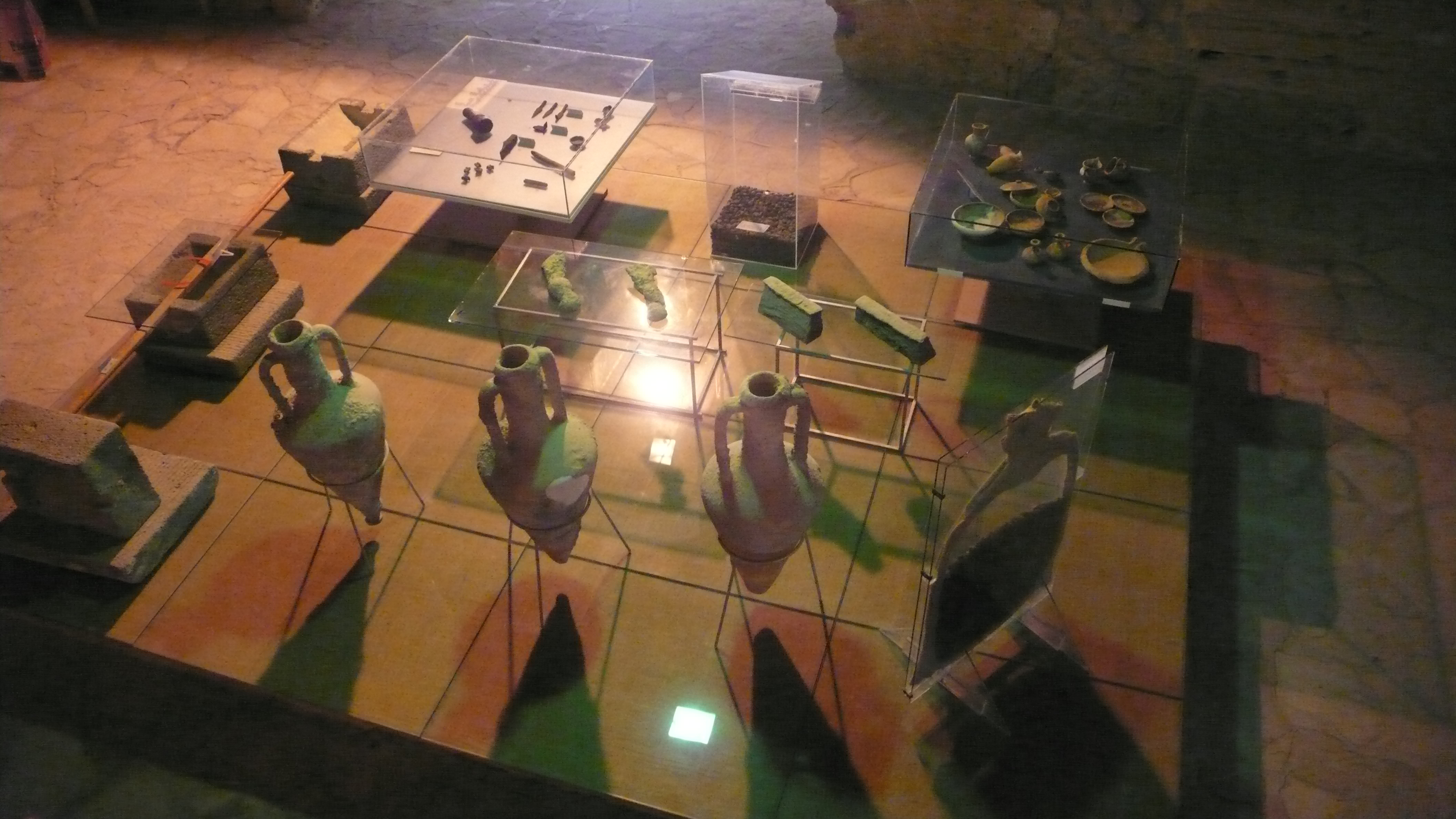
Objects on display at the Kyrenia Castle Shipwreck Museum

The objects in Kyrenia Castle are the original ones that it carried during its last voyage about 2,300 years ago. From them, we learned about the life of the captain and three sailors who manned the ship. The ship carried 381 amphoras or transport jars containing a cargo of wine, olive oil, and almonds—most amphoras aboard the Kyrenia Ship came from Rhodes (x340), with some from Knidos (x4), Samos (x1), Kos (x2), Palestine (x1), Egypt (Phoenician style, x1), Cyprus (x1) and possibly Kourion (x1). Some of the amphora stamps suggest that the ship sank between 294 and 291 BC, which is also supported by the seven bronze coins found on the shipwreck site. Five of these coins were minted in the name of Alexander the Great and date between ca. 334 BC and 301 BC. One coin is of unknown mint, and the other is a well-known type of Ptolemy I, produced only on Cyprus. This coin dates to post 294 BC. The ship's trade route included Rhodes, Cyprus, and the Levant, with Egypt as its possible final destination.

In addition a cargo of wine, oil, and almonds (over 9,000 in number), the Kyrenia Ship carried millstones and iron billets. Twenty-nine millstones, laden in three rows over the keel as cargo also served as ballast. At the stone quarry, probably on the island of Kos, masons carved letters of identification on their sides.

The sailors fished during the voyage and this is revealed by more than 300 lead net weights found in the bow. Meals were probably prepared ashore, using large casserole pots and a bronze cauldron. Aboard the ship were also four drinking cups (kantharoi), four oil containers (gutti), four wine measures (olpai), as well as bowls and saucers, and wooden spoons. This cabin pottery from the Kyrenia shipwreck suggests that the ship was sailed by a crew of four. The cabin pottery also indicates that the vessel's homeport was Rhodes, a conclusion further supported by the scientific analyses undertaken on these ceramics. Archaeologists also found javelins on the shipwreck site, which were most likely used for the protection of the crew during the ship's last voyage.

The Kyrenia ship may have had an earlier life with a Levantine crew. in the ship's bilges eight small pieces of pottery were found which include a fragment of a common type of Levantine jar, as well as seven fragments came from four to five drinking cups, known as Achaemenid cups, typical of the fifth and fourth centuries BC. Examples of these types of jars and drinking cups have been found along the modern-day Israeli coast.

The ship carried a single square sail and more than 100 lead rigging rings from its so-called brail sail were found on the shipwreck site. The wooden hull, built mostly of pine (Pinus brutia), was preserved for a length of almost 14.7 by 4.4 metres (48 by 14 ft) across. The ship was built using the "shell first" ancient method, the opposite of today's method. Contrary to the contemporary wood boat building method where a complete skeleton of frames of the entire vessel must first be constructed, in this case, the planking from the keel and up was joined first, using a mortise-and-tenon construction, and then the frames were laid in, secured with an ingenious assembly of wood pegs pierced by copper nails passing through both frames and planks. The ship was intended for long service and underwent four major repairs in her life. In the last repair, a skin of lead sheathing of 1.5 to 2 millimetres (0.059 to 0.079 in) thickness was applied to her body to hopefully keep the old ship comparatively safe from woodworm and probably help water tightness.

Preservation and conservation of the ship's artefacts and wooden hull was undertaken in 1970 and 1971, and from 1971 to 1973 the original timbers were reassembled on permanent scaffolding, still on exhibit today, along with its cargoes and goods of crew in Kyrenia Castle.

At the time of its sinking, the Kyrenia ship carried only one anchor. The anchor remains found on the wreck show the remains come from single one-armed wooden hook anchor with a lead-filled wooden stock. The original anchor had a central wooden shaft called the shank, made from a crooked grown oak timber, which terminated in a hook or arm This arm was set perpendicular to lead-filled stock—this configuration ensured that it would fall down and dig itself into the seabed. Only the heavy lead inserts of the stock, which provided the necessary weight to sink the anchor, the iron concretion of the anchor's fluke tip, and small wood fragments were found on Kyrenia.

This anchor type relied solely on its ability to grip the seabed. The earliest mention of a hook anchor is from a Greek poem by Alcaeus dating to the mid-seventh century BC. The Greeks attributed the invention of the hook anchor to several semi-legendary figures, including King Midas of Phrygia, but the real inventor is unknown.

== Sailing reconstructions ==
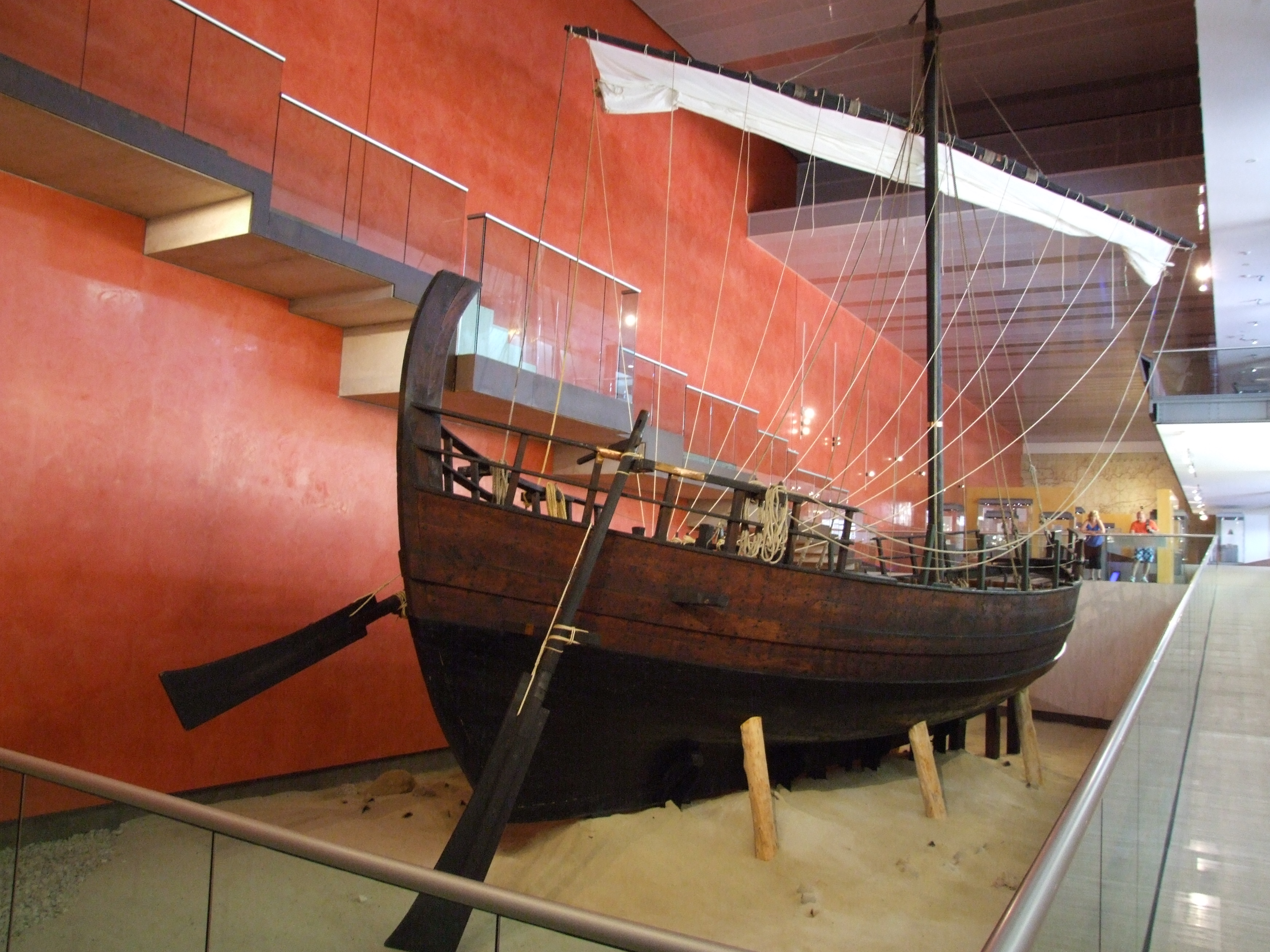
Kyrenia II

Kyrenia II In 1985, the President and founder of the Hellenic Institute for the Preservation of Nautical Tradition (HIPNT) Harry Tzalas in close cooperation with Michael Katzev and ancient ship re-constructor Richard Steffy with a number of Greek experts on traditional boat building and underwater archaeology, completed a full-size, sailing reconstruction of the ship, known as Kyrenia II. The ship was constructed following an exact procedure as the one followed by the ancient boatbuilder of the ancient ship of Kyrenia. This was achieved at the Manolis Psaros boatyard in Piraeus Greece. Kyrenia II is often used as a floating ambassador of Cypriot culture, and has visited many parts of the world. In 1986, it visited New York City; in 1988, Japan; and in 1989, West Germany.

Kyrenia III Following the 1988 visit to Japan, the Japanese National Television Organization N.H.K under the project management of executive producer Yasuji Hamagami constructed the second full size replica of the ship of Kyrenia. The ship was named "KYRENIA-3" and is normally exhibited at the Nautical museum of Fukuoka or Hakata.

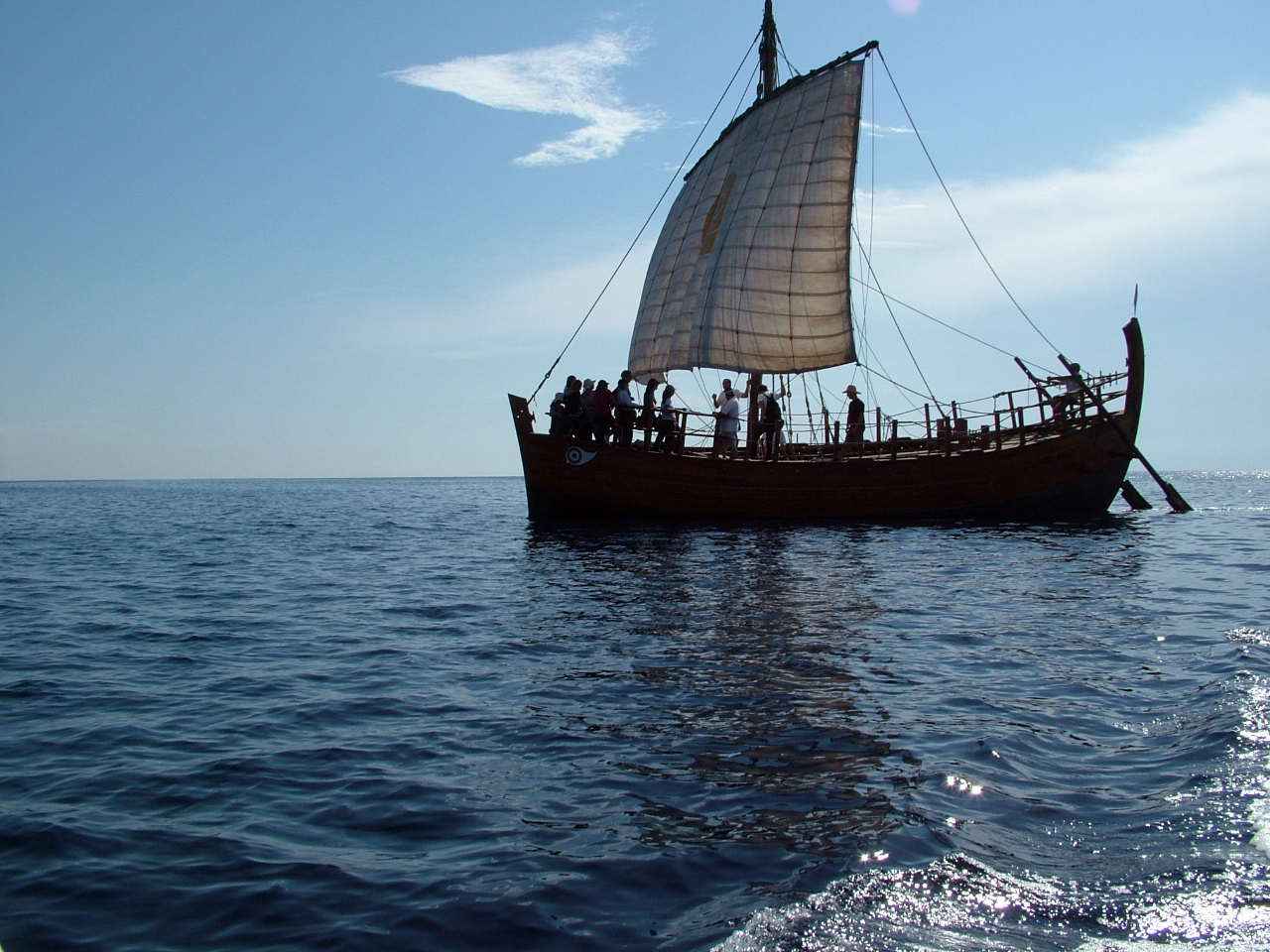
The Kyrenia Liberty Ship (photo taken at October 2012)

Kyrenia Liberty In 2002, a third reconstruction of the Kyrenia ship was built and named Kyrenia Liberty. It was constructed with respect for the original design but with modern techniques. The ship was ready for the 2004 Olympic Games and set sail for Athens, Greece with a symbolic cargo of copper to be used in the Olympic bronze medals. This cargo was symbolic since the name Cyprus is associated with the Latin word for "copper".

== Popular culture ==
Kyrenia features on three of the Cypriot euro coins: the 10, 20, and 50 euro-cents.

== See also ==
- List of surviving ancient ships
- Shipwreck
- Ma'agan Michael Ship
- Uluburun shipwreck
