= Ma'agan Michael Ship =

Well-preserved 5th-century BCE boat

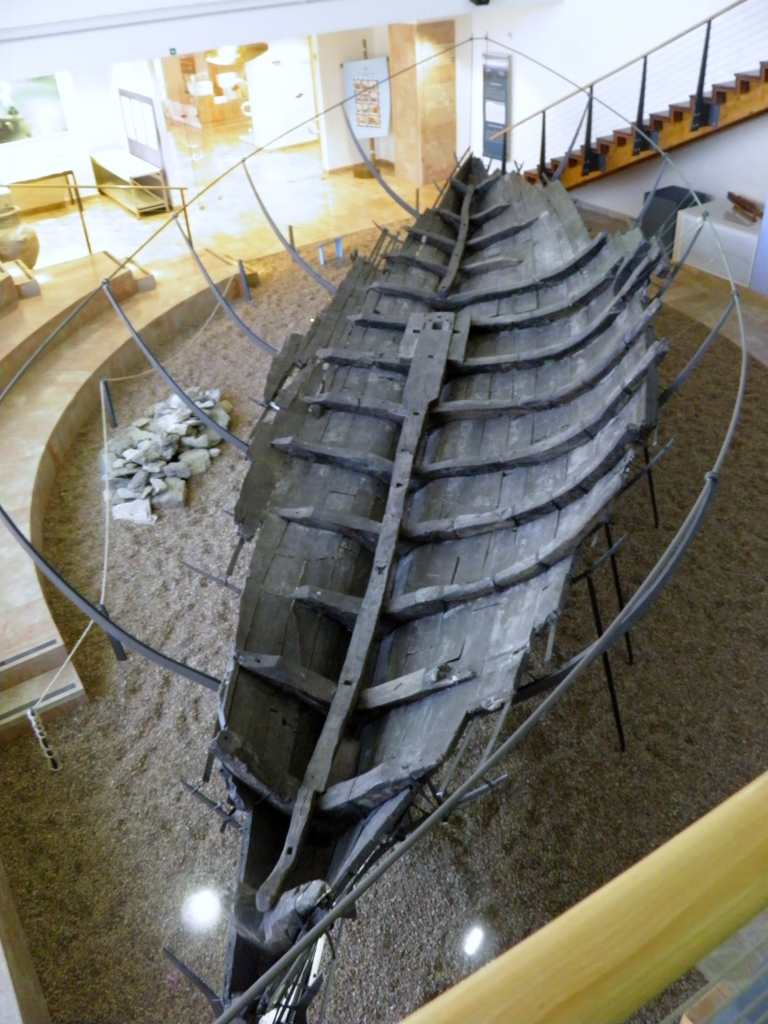
Ma'agan Michael boat on display at the Hecht Museum in Haifa

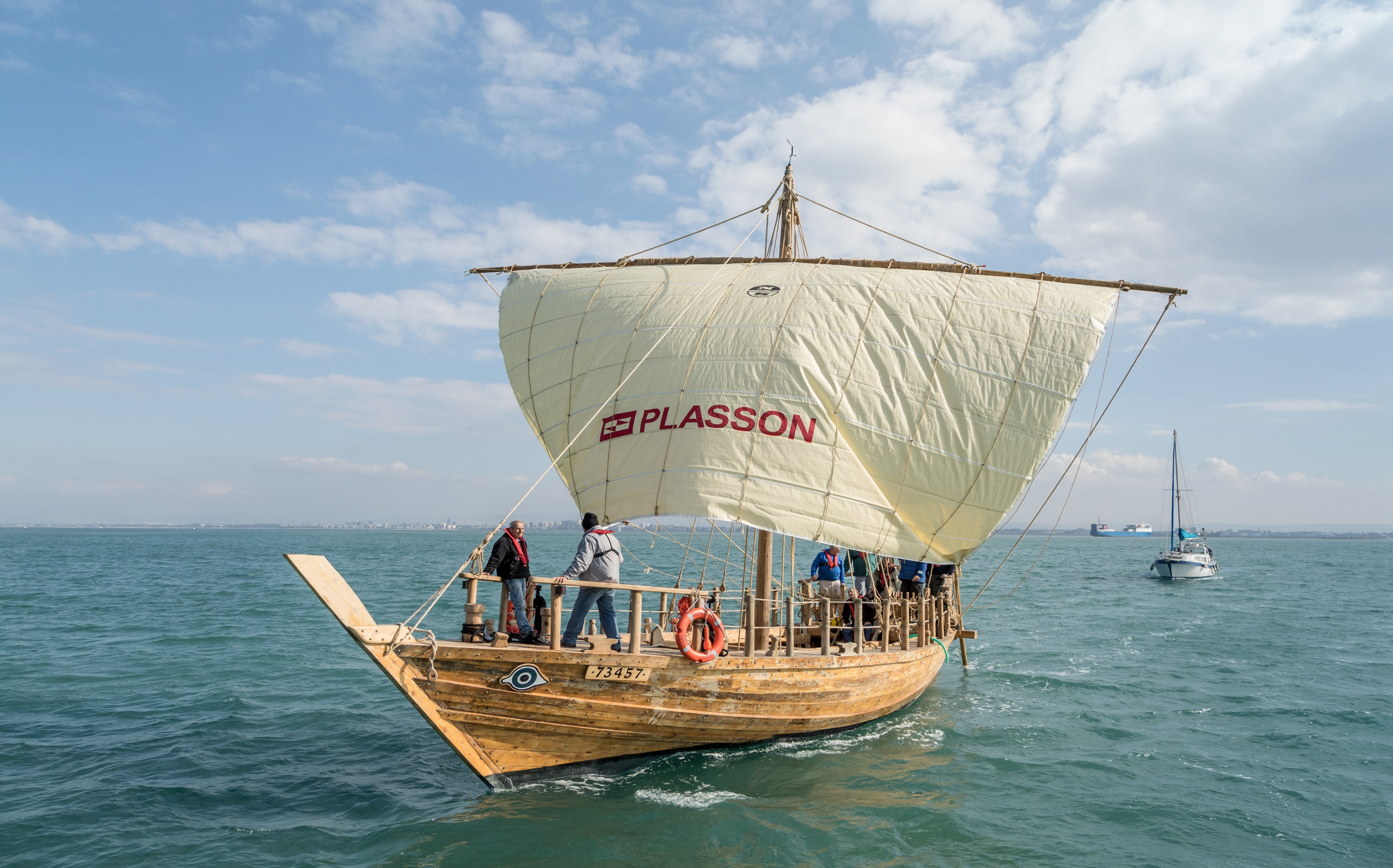
Replica in full size of the Ma'agan Michael Ship. The ship that was built by Prof. Yaacov Kahanov and a team from University of Haifa, was launched in December 2016

The Ma'agan Michael Ship (Hebrew: הספינה העתיקה ממעגן מיכאל) is a well-preserved 5th-century BCE boat discovered off the coast of Kibbutz Ma'agan Michael, Israel, in 1985. The ship was excavated and its timber immersed in preservation tanks at the University of Haifa, undergoing a seven-year process of impregnation by heated polyethylene glycol (PEG). In March 1999, the boat was reassembled and transferred to a dedicated wing built at the Hecht Museum, on the grounds of the university. The boat has provided researchers with insights into ancient methods of shipbuilding and the evolution of anchors.

== Discovery and excavation ==
In the autumn of 1985, Ami Eshel, a member of Ma'agan Michael, discovered the wreck while diving off the coast of the kibbutz, 35 km south of Haifa. 75 metres off the coast Eshel spotted rocks uncharacteristic of the Levantine coast next to pieces of wood and pottery sherds, and alerted the Israel Antiquities Authority and the Centre for Maritime Studies at the University of Haifa. Preliminary exploration of the wreck revealed pottery dating the ship to the 5th century BC as well as a great deal of submerged wood in an excellent state of preservation, encouraging further exploration. In 1987 a University of Haifa team led by Elisha Linder received a permit to excavate the site. They enlisted the help of Jay Rosloff, a hull specialist from Institute of Nautical Archaeology at Texas A&M University.

As the boat lay in shallow waters, 2 meters (6 ft 7 in) deep, excavators had to deal with difficult working conditions caused by the surge. Sand continuously drifted into the excavation trench and water clarity was poor. A horseshoe trench dredged around the site did little to ameliorate these problems, and conditions were seldom safe enough for both the crew and the unearthed wood. In the three seasons of work, totalling 160 days, only 32 days were actually spent excavating the ship and its contents. The small size of the site meant that no more than three pairs of divers could work on the ship at any one time.

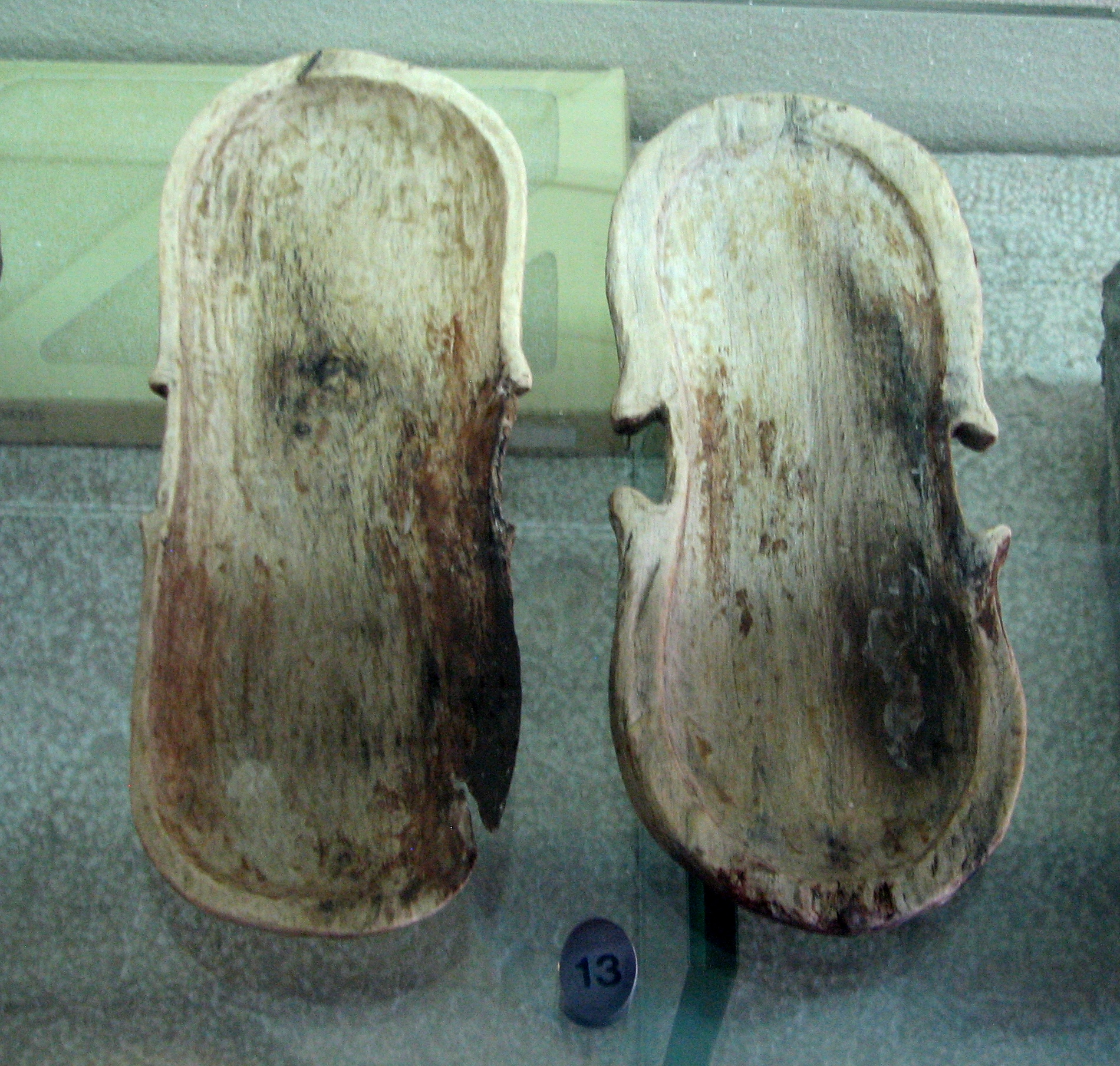
Violin-shaped box found on the boat

The excavators first removed the ship's ballast, pulling the stones to shore on a sled tied to a van. The ballast was revealed to be composed of the three lithological groups: metamorphic, magmatic and sedimentary rock. The first, composing 65 percent of the total, was blueschist apparently originating from Euboea. Gabbro rocks found were revealed to originate in the Kouris River of southern Cyprus.

Most of the boat was buried deep enough in the sand to be isolated from the aerobic conditions that would have degraded the wood and the seawater and its corrosive effect on metals. It was subsequently superbly preserved. Exploration started at the stern and moved forward. Only a few feet of the hull were excavated, mapped and photographed at a time, to prevent wave damage to exposed sections. Several of the planks had to be sawed or broken for removal, transportation and conservation, especially as prolonged underwater exposure might have caused significant damage. The preserved hull is 37 feet (11 metres) long and 13.1 feet (4.0 metres) wide, with an estimated displacement weight of 20 tons, over 12 of which was ballast. The keel consists of a single timber 25 feet (7.6 metres) long, 4.5 inches (11 cm) wide and 6.25 inches (15.9 cm) high. The hull was constructed primarily of Aleppo pine, except for the tenons and the false keel which were made of oak. The wood shows no sign of shipworm damage nor the wear characteristic of lengthy use, leading the excavators to believe the ship may have sunk on its maiden voyage or not long afterwards.

Artifacts recovered from the wreck include an olivewood box in the shape of a heart or leaf and with a swivel top and a pair of violin-shaped boxes. All were probably used for cosmetics or jewelry. Also found were a collection of woodworking tools, a large number of treenails and tenons, plus a whetstone. Seventy pottery vessels, many of them complete, were found in the wreck. These include jugs, plates, lamps, a cooking pot, a water jar, several storage jars, decorated amphorae, miniature juglets and black glazed ware. Most are attributed to Cyprus, but some may have originated in Greece or the Israeli coast. Also located among the wreck were remnants of food, including grape, fig, olive and barley. These appear to originate in the eastern Mediterranean, most likely southwest Turkey and adjacent islands, and indicate that the boat sank during the summer. Other organic material includes a woven basket and a large amount of rope. The copper nails used in construction of the ship were revealed to be made of copper mined in northwest Cyprus.

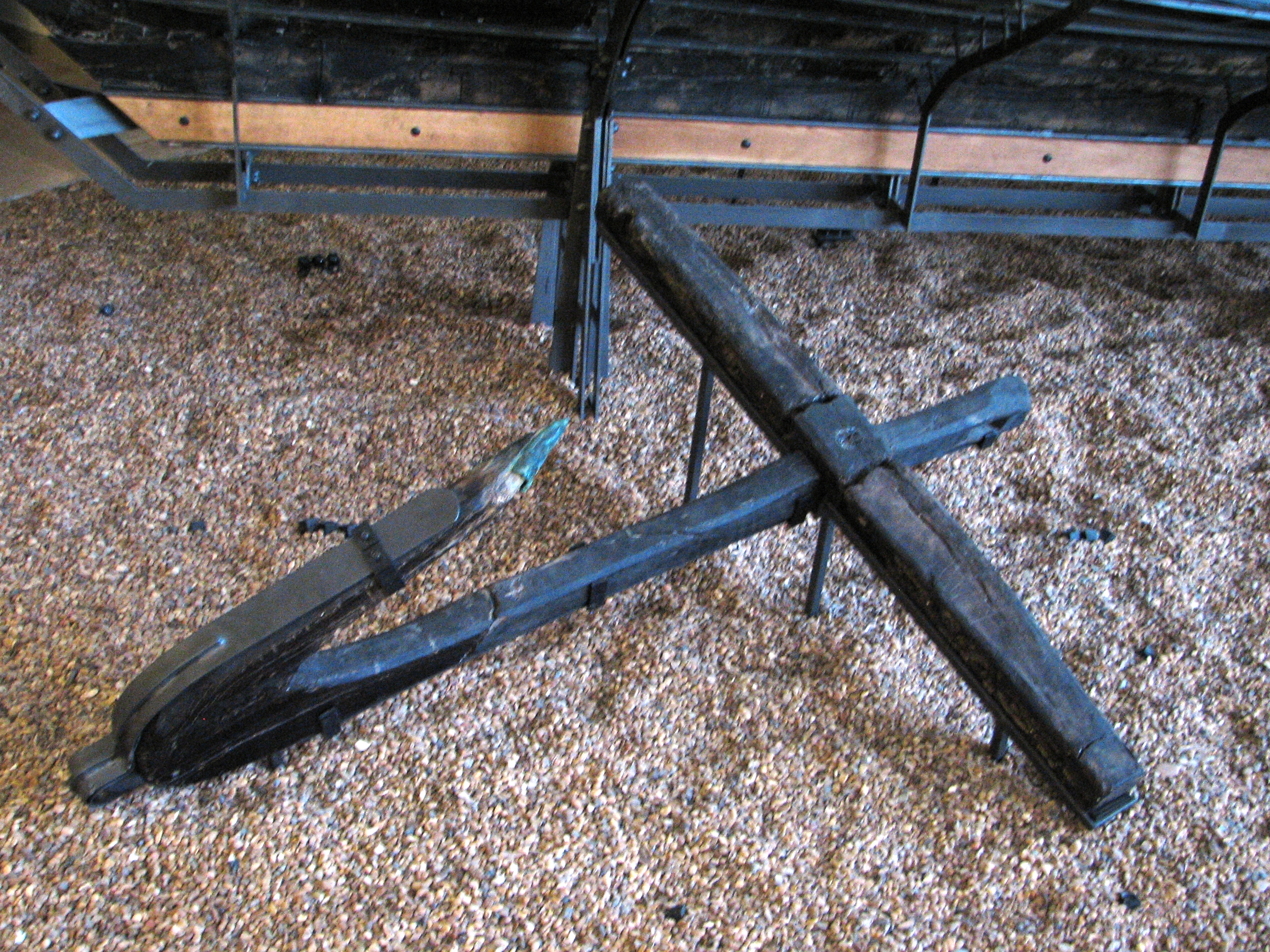
Ship anchor

Dating from a time of peak Phoenician maritime activity, the boat was initially thought to be Phoenician. In view of its construction and contents it was later deemed most likely to be Cypriot, perhaps related to a Cypriot centre at nearby Dor.

=== Anchor ===
The ship's one-armed anchor, made from oak and with a lead-filled stock, was discovered off the ship's starboard bow, with the remains of rope still attached. The anchor's body, from head through shank to arm, was carved from a single timber, as was the stock. The wood used in its construction was identical to the one used on the ship's tenons, suggesting it was made by the same carpenters or shipwrights as the boat itself. A tooth made of copper had almost entirely corroded away.

== Significance ==
The discovery of the ship provided researchers with insights into the development of ancient shipbuilding. The ship displays many similarities to other ancient ships such as the Kyrenia ship, but also important differences in size, construction methods and material, and ballast. Beside offering clues to the evolution of anchors, the Ma'agan Michael anchor is also the first complete one-armed ancient wooden anchor ever discovered. Although absent from iconographic and literary source, maritime archaeologist Gerhard Käpitan had already suggested their existence in the 1970s. The discovery not only confirmed this variety existed but that it was neither crude nor restricted to small craft.

== Preservation and display ==
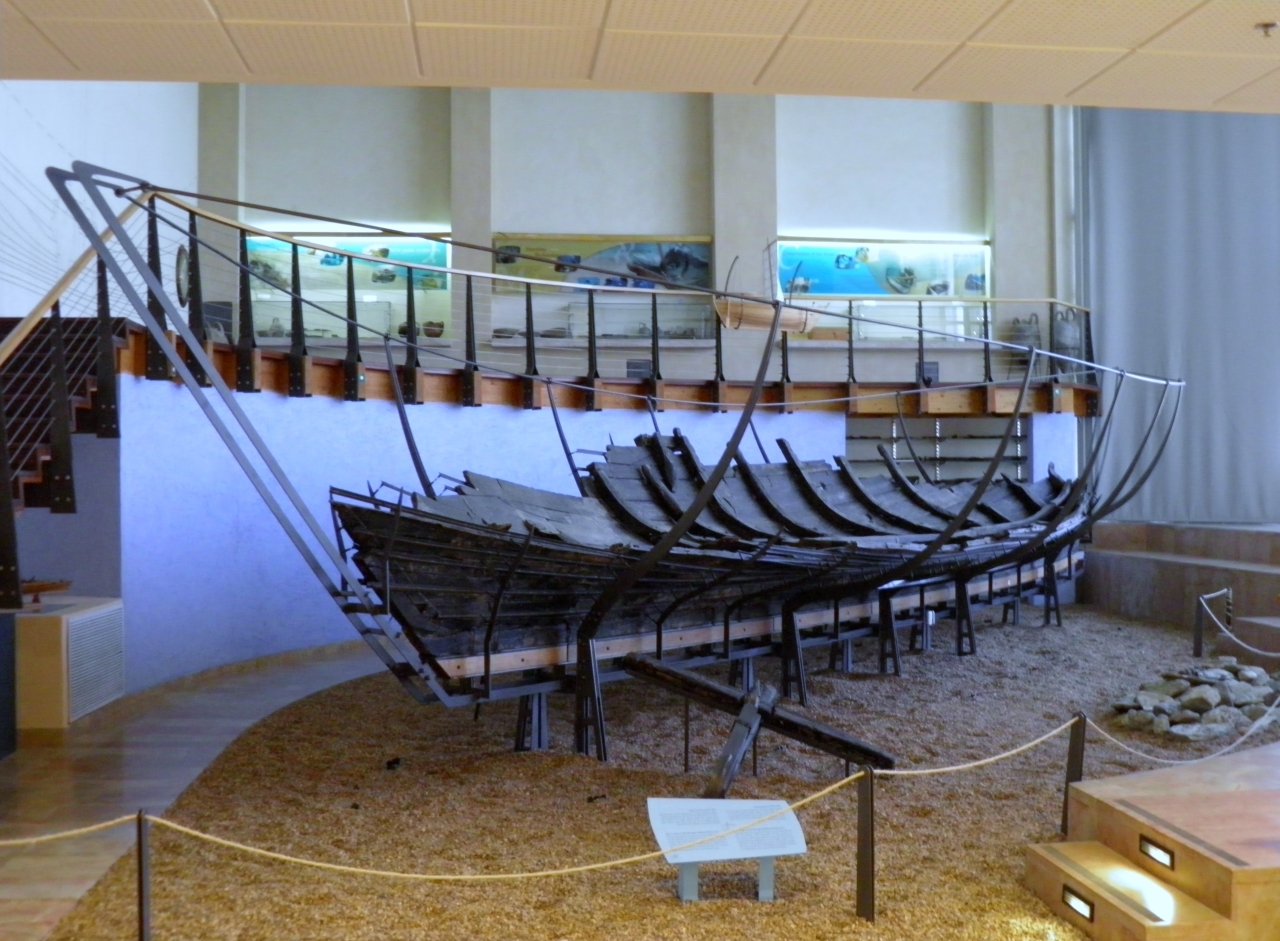
Ship, anchor and ballast on display

All finds and ship components retrieved from the sea were immediately placed in fresh-water tanks. From there the timber was transferred to permanent preservation tanks in the University of Haifa, where the timber went through a seven-year process of impregnation by heated polyethylene glycol (PEG) to enhance dimensional stability by replacing the water in the cells. Completed in 1996, the wood was then left to season until March 1999, when it was transferred to a dedicated wing built at the Hecht Museum, on the university grounds. The reassembled boat is currently on display along with selected finds including the anchor, ropes, woodworking tools, ornamental wooden boxes and pottery from the wreck.

== Replica ==
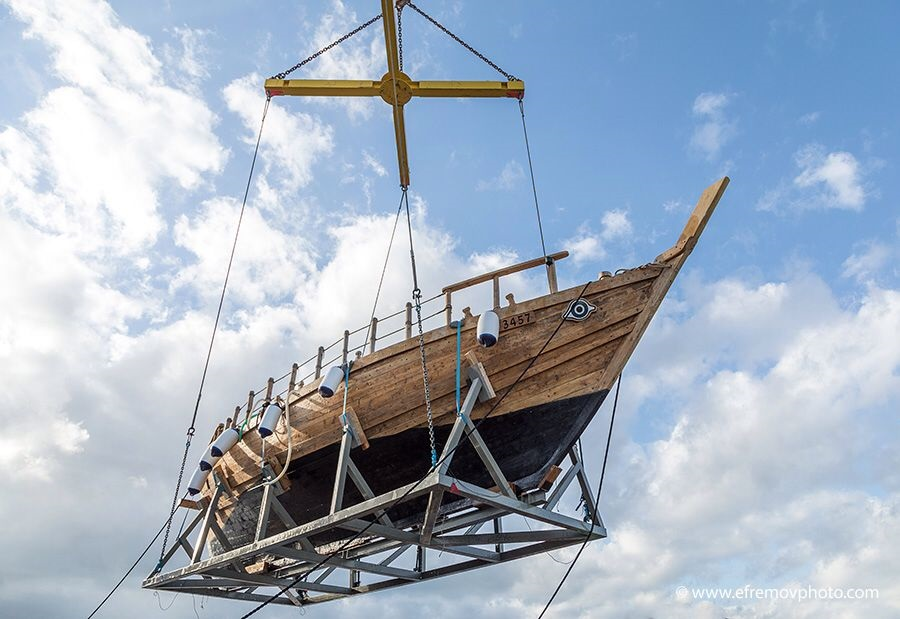
The replica of the old ship at the Israel Shipyards is lifted before it is lowered into the water

On March 17, 2017, a replica of the boat was launched, by the University of Haifa and the Israel Antiquities Authority, at Haifa Bay.

== See also ==
- The Sea of Galilee Boat
- Kyrenia ship
- Archaeology of Israel
- List of surviving ancient ships
