= Reuben Hecht =

Israeli art collector (1909–1993)

- ראובן הכט
- Born: 15 August 1909
- Died: 14 April 1993 (aged 83)
- Spouse: Edith (m. 1941–1993)

Reuben R. Hecht (Hebrew: ראובן הכט; 15 August 1909 – 14 April 1993) was an Israeli industrialist. He was the founder of the Hecht Museum. In 1984, he was awarded the Israel Prize for Exemplary Lifetime Service to the Society and State.

== Biography ==
Reuben Hecht was born in Antwerp, Belgium. His parents were Jacob and Ella Hecht. Jacob Hecht and his brother Herman founded the Neptun Rhenania shipping company. When Reuben was nine, the family moved to Basel, Switzerland. Hecht became interested in Zionism after reading anti-Zionist materials published by the Centralverein deutscher Staatsbürger jüdischen Glaubens encouraging Jewish assimilation. He served as a counselor in the Zionist youth movement "Blue and White." In 1933 he worked with Ze'ev Jabotinsky at the Paris headquarters of the Revisionist Zionist movement.

After the establishment of the State of Israel, Hecht won an exclusive concession to build grain storage silos in Haifa and Ashdod. He founded Dagon Batei-Mamgurot Le-Israel Ltd. for this purpose.

Hecht was a principal aide to Prime Minister Menachem Begin at the Camp David peace talks and attended other meetings with Jimmy Carter, Ronald Reagan, Anwar Sadat and Margaret Thatcher.

Hecht contributed $50,000 to the Israel Museum's purchase of Moshe Dayan's collection from his widow; the purchase was completed in 1982. He established the Hecht Museum at Haifa University to house his collections of archeological artifacts and 19th-century paintings.

== Commemoration ==
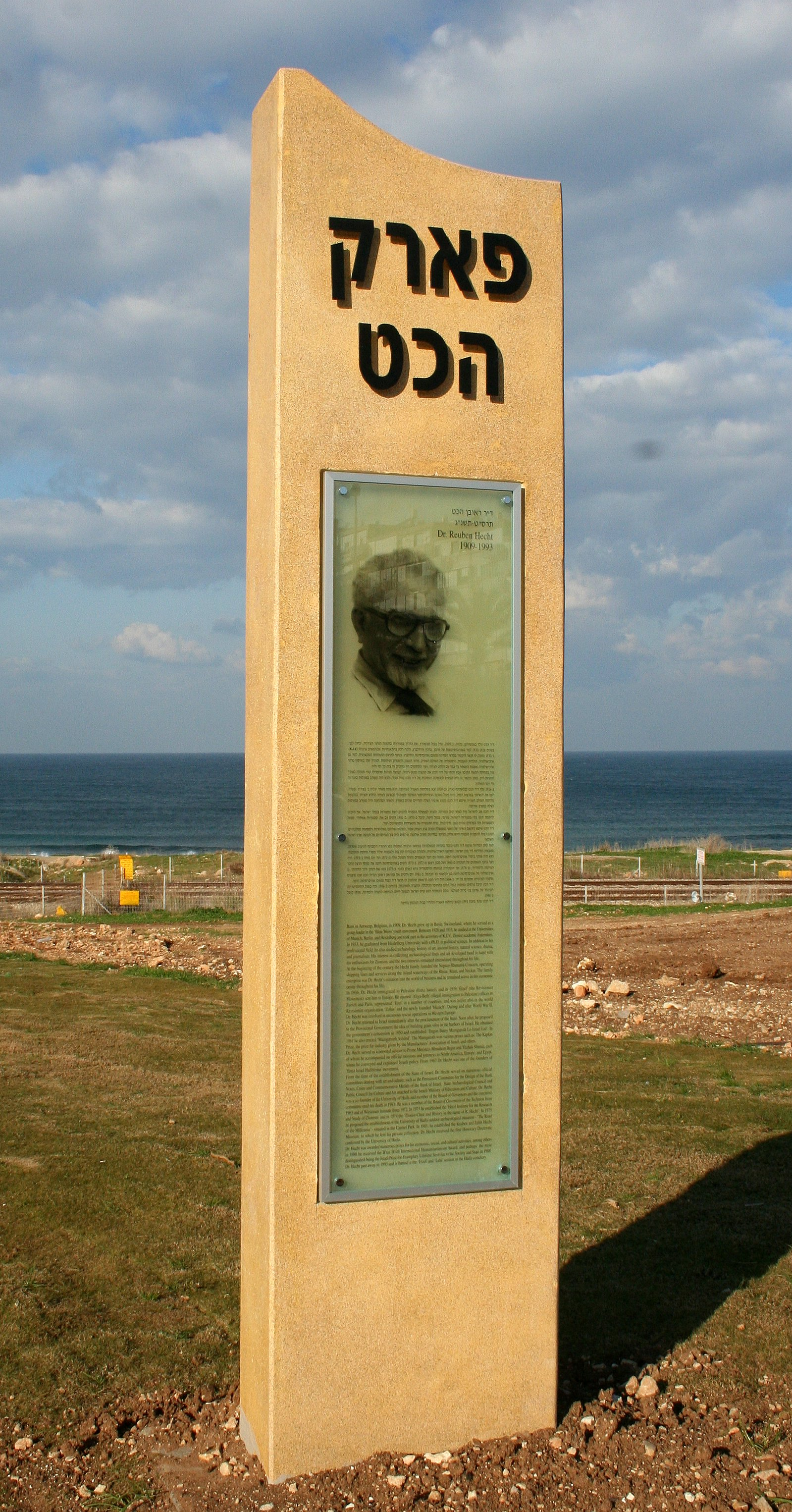
Reuben Hecht park under construction, 2008

- Hecht Foundation
- Hecht House
- Reuben Hecht Park
