= Bajo de la Campana Phoenician shipwreck =

Phoenician shipwreck near the coast of Cartagena, Spain

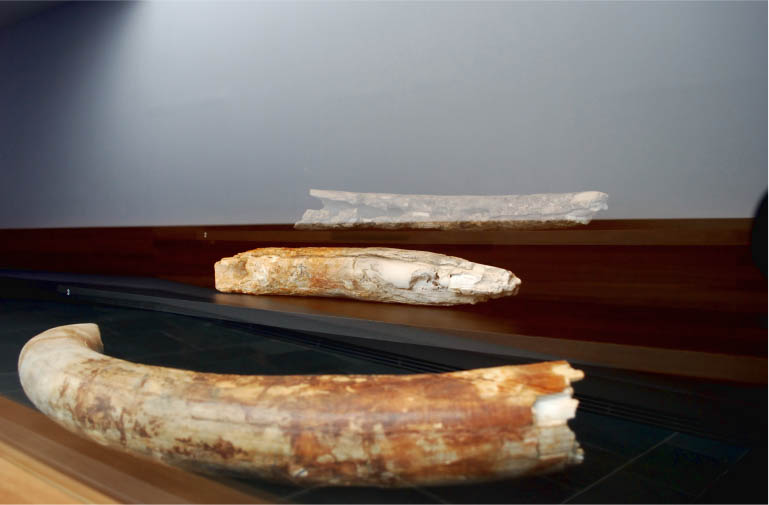
- Elephant tusks from the Phoenician wreck of the Bajo de la Campana

- Location within Spain
- 37°44′11″N 0°41′33″W
- Type: Site of a sunken ship
- Periods: Iron Age
- Location: Off the coast of La Manga del Mar Menor
- Region: Murcia, Spain

History
- Built: 7th century BC
- Built by: Phoenicians
- Abandoned: Sank late 7th century BC

Site notes
- Elevation: −16 m (−52 ft)
- Length: 20 m (66 ft)
- Width: 20 m (66 ft)
- Excavation dates: Excavation dives 2007 to 2011
- Archaeologists: Mark Polzer and Juan Piñedo Reyes, directors
- Discovered: 1958
- Condition: Conservation, sampling and study are ongoing
- Owner: Spain

The Bajo de la Campana Phoenician shipwreck is a seventh-century BC shipwreck of a Phoenician trade ship found at Bajo de la Campana, a submerged rock reef near Cartagena, Spain. This shipwreck was accidentally discovered in the 1950s. It is the earliest Phoenician shipwreck to date to undergo an archaeological excavation. Over the course of four field seasons, researchers conducted almost 4,000 dives and over 300 hours of exploration. The sunken ship spilled its cargo in and around an underwater cave at the edge of the Bajo reef. Among the artifacts recovered were fragments of the ship's hull, along with terracotta vessels, including amphoras, bowls, and plates. Among the cargo were elephant ivory tusks. Additionally, the discovery of tin ingots, copper ingots, and galena nuggets suggests the ship's involvement in long-distance trade networks. The cargo also contained pine cones, double-sided wooden combs, amber nodules from the Baltic, and various raw materials such as timber and resin. Provisions and personal items of the crew were also recovered from the wreck, such as a gaming piece, a whetstone with Phoenician graffiti, and nuts and seeds. The wreck is identified as a Phoenician merchant vessel.

== Location and discovery ==
The Bajo de la Campana, located approximately 2.5 km (1.6 mi) offshore from La Manga del Mar Menor and is located around 20 miles Northeast of Cartagena, Spain. Bajo de la Campana consists of three geological formations: Isla Grosa, El Farallón rock, and La Laja reef. La Laja, also known as the Bajo de la Campana, is a shallow reef rising from a depth of about 16 m (52 feet) to within 2 m (6.6 feet) of the water’s surface, making it a navigational hazard. Shipwreck debris surrounding the Bajo indicates its historical danger. Other ancient shipwrecks at Bajo de la Campana include a Punic ship from the 2nd century BCE and a Roman ship from the 1st century CE.

Archaeological material was first discovered at the site in 1958 by commercial scrap-metal salvaging divers and later by recreational divers. Sport divers took exposed artifacts from the Phoenician shipwreck as souvenirs but soon after returned significant pieces to Spanish authorities in 1979. The Spanish Ministry of Culture conducted inspections in 1972 and 1988, leading to the conclusion that the recovered artifacts represented three distinct shipwrecks from different periods: late seventh-century BC Phoenician, second-century BC Punic, and first-century AD Roman. In 2006, the Institute of Nautical Archaeology (INA) initiated an investigation and formalized a cooperation with the Ministry of Culture of Spain in 2007. A survey conducted by INA in 2007 on the eastern side of the Bajo confirmed previous findings and indicated that most of the Phoenician ship wreckage remained buried beneath rocks, sediment, and seagrass. As a result, a full-scale excavation and study were launched in 2008. The surveyed area measured approximately 20 m × 20 m (66 ft × 66 ft); it is bordered along its western edge by the sheer face of the Bajo de la Campana which contains a shallow cave in the northwestern corner, where many of the shipwreck finds were located.

== The Ship's Journey ==
The Phoenician ship at Bajo de la Campana was presumed to have been a trading vessel that was traveling from the Eastern Mediterranean to the Western Mediterranean. The varied array of goods in the cargo, including raw materials, manufactured goods, and luxury items, sourced from various geographical locations, suggest the ship's involvement in long-distance trade networks. Polzer interprets some of the high-value objects as goods that may have been intended for exchange with local communities in Iberia. Additionally, other items recovered were likely intended for Phoenician workshops along the coast of Spain as well as further East.

Polzer and Pinedo Reyes proposed a reconstruction in which the vessel was sailing eastward along the Iberian coast when adverse weather forced it toward the hazards around Cabo de Palos. In their interpretation, the ship struck the Bajo de la Campana reef and sank nearby.

== Ship remains ==
Little has survived of the Phoenician ship. The remains of the ship and its cargo were concentrated primarily along the northern edge of the site, including the cave area. Most of the large fragments of the ship were swept away by ocean currents, as only a few fragments of the ship's hull where discovered. A large amount of smaller remnants of the ship and cargo remained in place at the shipwreck. Many of the smaller remains were trapped in a cave at the base of the shoal. Additionally, many small remains were trapped between rocks at the base of the shoal and some pottery pieces were scattered around the seabed, held down by sediment. The remains of the ship and cargo were scattered across 4,300 square feet of seabed.

Excavations have yielded ballast stones used as weights to provide stability to the ship, dunnage material used to keep the cargo in place, and only one fragment of hull wood, likely softwood, measuring approximately 43 cm (17 inches) long, 11 cm (4.3 inches) wide, and 35 mm (1.4 inches) thick. This fragment preserves part of a scarf joint and most of one mortise, with a tenon peg hole.

== Cargo ==
=== Raw materials ===
The ship's cargo, predominantly consisting of raw materials includes 64 elephant tusks, with many bearing Phoenician inscriptions. Readings of the ivory inscriptions identified at least two male personal names, as well as morphemes that may indicate the individuals’ rank or function. Spanish archaeologist Fernando Lopez advances that the names are of the suppliers of the ivory. Additionally, at least 11 of the elephant tusks bear religious Phoenician inscriptions. All of the religious inscriptions on the elephant tusks are votive in nature and include a declaration of piety to a god or a request for a blessing. Phoenician gods that are referenced on these inscriptions include the Phoenician goddess Ashtart and the god Eshmun. The votive inscriptions have led some researchers to propose that the tusks were intended for dedication at a sanctuary.

The cargo also contained raw metals, including over a ton of lead ore, 154 plano-convex ingots of tin and thirteen of copper (mostly small and circular), along with 10,000 galena nuggets used in silver extraction. Polzer suggests that the quantities may represent material intended for a specific workshop rather than bulk shipment. Additional raw material findings include two small lumps of Baltic amber, logs of chopped wood, thick globs of dark resin, and an earthen material such as potting clay or red ochre. Isotopic analysis conducted on the raw materials found at the shipwreck indicates that the ship’s cargo of metals was mined from many geological sources. Specifically, the lead came from Southeastern Spain, the tin from the Northwestern Mediterranean, the copper ingots from at least eight different regions in the Mediterranean region, ranging from southern Iberia to Sardinia and Cyprus.

=== Manufactured goods and luxury items ===
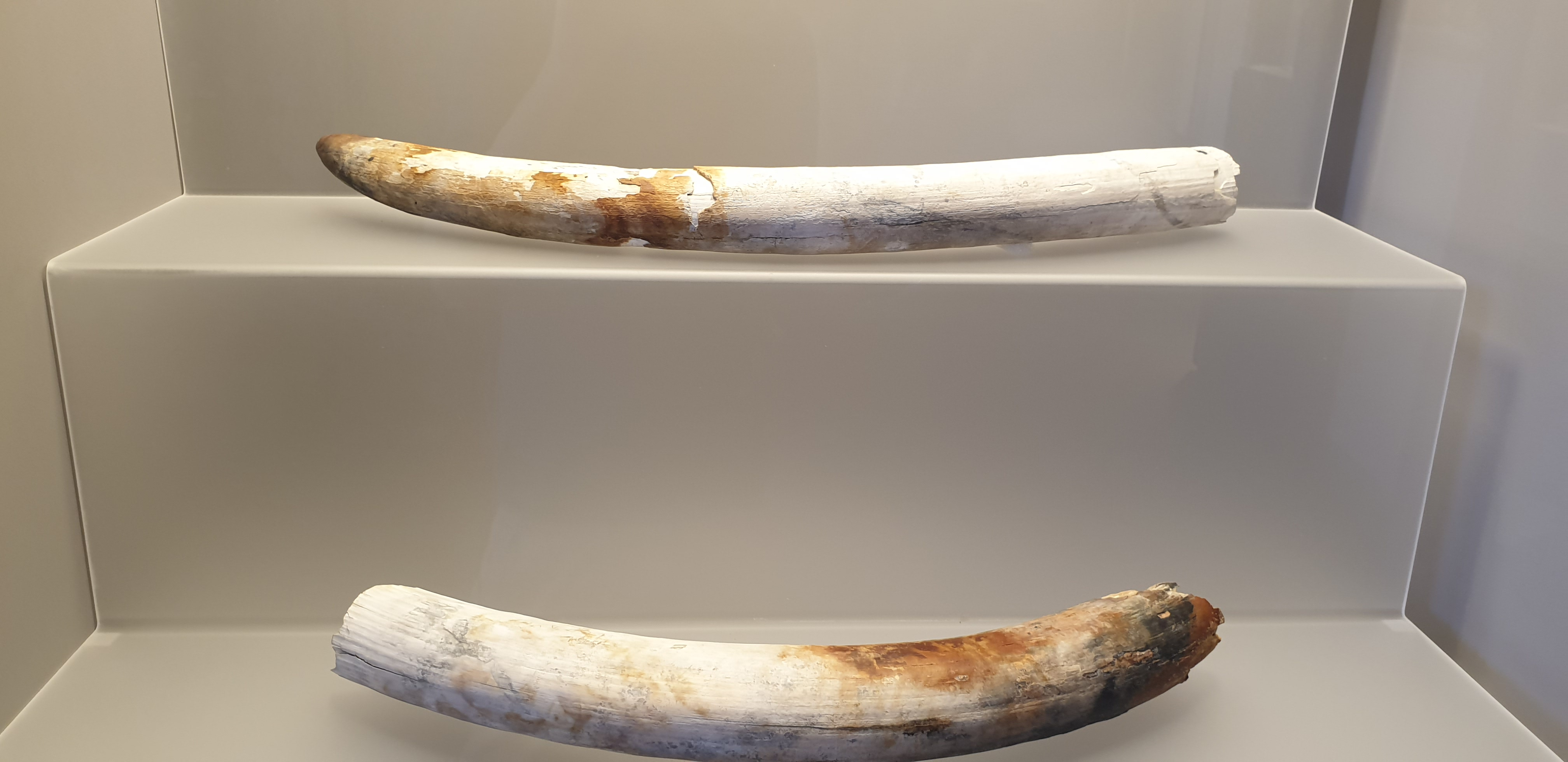
Elephant tusks with Phoenician inscriptions from the Bajo de la Campana Phoenician shipwreck on display in Rome

The ship carried a diverse range of Phoenician pottery, including amphoras, plates, pots, bowls, tripod mortars, lamos, an oil lamp, and various jugs and pitchers. Among the amphoras found are Vuillemot type R-1 and Cintas type 268. Vuillemot type R-1, produced in colonial workshops in Spain and North Africa, was distributed widely from the Atlantic coast of Morocco to Sicily. Fragments of these amphoras from Bajo de la Campana indicate production in the region of Málaga. Cintas type 268 amphoras, with an ovoid shape, were produced in Phoenician settlements on central Mediterranean islands and along the North African coast, with limited distribution in the western colonies, mainly Ibiza and the Mediterranean coast of Spain. Also found were small ceramic bottles, or unguentaria, used for perfumed oils, with examples from Archaic-period sites being imports from Phoenicia proper. These bottles were widely distributed across southern Spain and were primarily used in the 8th century BC, with some continuing into the 7th century BC. The bottles discovered at the Bajo de la Campana likely date to the end of the 7th century BC.

Excavations have revealed several exotic objects, including an ivory knife handle, double-ended boxwood combs, decorated ostrich eggs, ivory ring stand, a pin made of antler, a stone pedestal, an alabaster jar, a pale-green stone block, a bronze object, a gaming piece, and various bronze and wooden furniture elements. The carved ivory knife handle, though slightly damaged, retains an design and features a long slot for the blade tang and rivets. The wooden combs, broken and poorly preserved, are made from boxwood and decorated with simple linear patterns. The tripartite limestone pedestal stands 72 cm (28 inches) tall when assembled, with a column, a capital with volutes, and abacus. Another stone object is a pale-green stone block, likely a whetstone used for sharpening bronze and iron tools. A singular bronze object in the shape of a right forearm holding a stylized lotus blossom is possibly part of a ceremonial staff or other significant object. A small stone cube was recovered which was thought to be a gaming piece. This gaming piece bears a Phoenician inscription on its surface which could be the name of the owner of the ship. The bronze furniture elements include legs, corner fittings, and wooden pieces, likely parts of ornate chairs, stools, or beds.

== Importance ==
The Phoenician shipwreck at Bajo de la Campana was the first potential Phoenician shipwreck between 850 and 600 BCE to be found, excavated and systematically studied in the Mediterranean region. The cargo on this ship has provided important insights into the Phoenician's presence in Spain, specifically their trading networks and their workshops along the coast. Additionally, the remains of the ship's hull allowed archeologist to analyze the structure and engineering of a Phoenician ship, which was a rare opportunity. On a larger scale this Phoenician ship shows the interconnectedness of the ancient Mediterranean as it carried goods from at least 12 different spread out locations in the Mediterranean.

== See also ==
- Gozo Phoenician shipwreck – Phoenician shipwreck near the coast of Malta
- Marsala Punic shipwreck – 3rd-century BC shipwreck off Sicily
- Phoenician joints – Wood joinery technique used in shipbuilding
