= 3003 =

3003 can refer to:

- Singmaster's conjecture, which states that there is a fixed upper bound on the number of occurrences of any binomial coefficient; the most frequent known is 3003 with eight occurrences: 3003 = 14C6 = 14C8 = 15C5 = 15C10 = 78C2 = 78C76 = 3003C1 = 3003C3002.
- The year 3003 and its temporal environs are described in Timeline of the far future
