= Honor Frost =

Underwater archaeologist

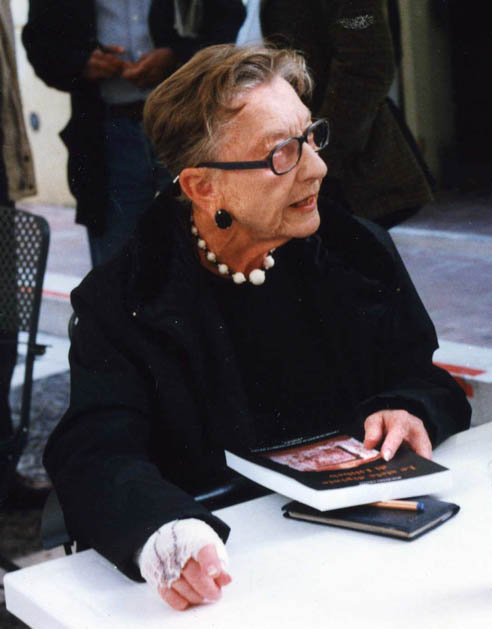
- Honor Frost
- Born: 28 October 1917; Nicosia, Cyprus
- Died: 12 September 2010 (aged 92)
- Scientific career
- Fields: Underwater archaeology
- Institutions: Institute of Archaeology

Honor Frost (28 October 1917 – 12 September 2010) was a pioneer in the field of underwater archaeology, who led many Mediterranean archaeological investigations, especially in Lebanon, and was noted for her typology of stone anchors and skills in archaeological illustration.

== Early life ==
An only child, Frost was born in Nicosia, Cyprus. She was orphaned at an early age and became the ward of Wilfrid Evill, a London solicitor and art collector.

Frost studied art at the Central School of Art, and the Ruskin School of art, she then worked on ballet set design with Rambert and held a job at Tate Britain as the Director of Publications. Alongside these artistic pursuits, she was also the adventurous sort who once put on a diving suit at a friend's party in Wimbledon to dive into the 17th-century well in the backyard. From this first foray into diving onward, Frost was hooked, saying that "Time spent out of the water was time wasted".

== Career ==
Frost became a diver soon after Cousteau's invention of SCUBA, and worked as a diver and artist in the early 1950s in France and Italy. As a member of the world's first scuba diving club, the Club Alpin Sous-Marin, her first experience of the underwater excavation of shipwrecks was with Frédéric Dumas. Dumas would later go on to help her on the Gelidonya excavation.

In 1957, Frost worked on her first land excavation as a draughtsmen in Jericho led by Dame Kathleen Kenyon.

An expedition in Turkey resulted in the discovery of a late Bronze Age shipwreck at Gelidonya, for which Frost is credited as having realised its significance. The wreck had been previously discovered by Turkish diver Mustafa Kapkin and U.S. photo-journalist Peter Throckmorton in 1959. However, it was Frost who recognised that the wreck was not Mycenean, but Phoenician, thus providing the first evidence that Phoenicians had been trading on the seas before the Iron Age. She convinced Joan du Plat Taylor, whom she had met at the Institute of Archaeology in London, to become co-director of the excavation at Gelidonya. It was later the site of George Bass's and Peter Throckmorton's first work in underwater archaeology at Cape Gelidonya in the Antalya region of southern Turkey. The Bronze Age shipwreck, which dated to the 12th century BC, was the oldest known shipwreck in the world at that time. The excavation of this wreck is of special significance, as it was the first to be conducted following a rigorous scientific approach. The Gelidonya excavation was also the first shipwreck that was fully excavated on the seabed.

In 1968 she led a UNESCO expedition to survey the Pharos site in the Port of Alexandria, for which she was later awarded, in 1997, a French government medal for pioneering submarine archaeology in Egypt.

From 1971 she led the investigation of the Marsala Punic shipwreck in Sicily, Italy.

In 2005, BSAC awarded her the Colin McLeod award for Furthering international co-operation in diving for her work in archaeology.

She died on 12 September 2010. The substantial art collection that she had inherited upon Wilfrid Evill's death was used to endow the Honor Frost Foundation which supplies funds for underwater archaeology in the Mediterranean. The Honor Frost Archive, part of the Maritime Archaeology Special Collections at the University of Southampton Library, contains field notes, drawings, and reports from her archaeological work, as well as a large number of photographs. Many of her books are also now held at the University of Southampton library.

== Personal life ==
Frost owned a second home in Malta with her primary residence in Marylebone as inherited from Evill, where she possessed a major collection of artworks from 20th-century British painters, especially those by Stanley Spencer. This collection was auctioned after her death, the proceeds of which comprise the bulk of funding for the Honor Frost Foundation. She regularly contributed to the Mariner's Mirror, the journal published by the Society of Nautical Studies, most notably on the anchor, which was regarded as her favourite topic.

== Selected publications ==
- (1963) Under the Mediterranean: Marine Antiquities. Routledge. ISBN 978-0710014337
- (1964) Diggings In The Deep in Saudi Aramco World November/December 1964
- (1973) 'Ancore, the potsherds of marine archaeology: on the recording of pierced stones from the Mediterranean', Marine Archaeology 1973, pp. 397–409.
- (1974) 'The Punic wreck in Sicily 1. Second season of excavation.' International Journal of Nautical Archaeology 3.1:35–40 doi:10.1111/j.1095-9270.1974.tb00856.x
- (1975) 'The Pharos Site, Alexandria, Egypt.' International Journal of Nautical Archaeology, 4.1:126–130.
- (1976) 'When is a wreck not a wreck?' International Journal of Nautical Archaeology, 5.2:01–105 doi:10.1111/j.1095-9270.1976.tb00944.x
- (1985) 'Pyramidal Stone Anchors: An Enquiry.' in H.E. Tzalas (ed.) TROPIS I. 1st International Symposium on Ship Construction in Antiquity. Piraeus. 97–112
- (1987) 'Where did they build ancient warships?' in H.E. Tzalas (ed.) TROPIS 2. 2nd International Symposium on Ship Construction in Antiquity. 181–94.
- (1987) 'How Carthage Lost the Sea: Off the Coast of Sicily, a Punic Warship Gives up its Secret', Natural History, December 1987; 58–67
- (1989) 'Where did Bronze Age Ships Keep their Stone Anchors?' in H. Tzalas (ed.), TROPIS III. Proceedings of the 3rd International Symposium on Ship Construction in Antiquity, Athens 1989. 167–175.
- (1996) 'Old Saws' in H. Tzalas (ed.), TROPIS IV. 4th International Symposium on Ship Construction in Antiquity. 189–98.

== See also ==
- Maritime archaeology – Archaeological study of human interaction with the sea
- Archaeology of shipwrecks – Study of human activity through the analysis of shipwreck artifacts
- Wreck diving – Recreational diving on wrecks
