= David Singmaster =

British mathematician (1938–2023)

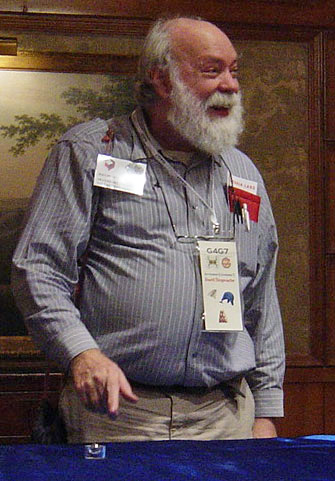
- Singmaster in 2006
- Born: 14 December 1938; Ferguson, Missouri, U.S.
- Died: 13 February 2023 (aged 84)
- Education: University of California, Berkeley
- Known for: Singmaster's conjecture Singmaster notation History of mathematics Mathematics of puzzles, especially the Rubik's Cube
- Scientific career
- Fields: Mathematics
- Workplaces: London South Bank University
- Thesis: On Means of Differences of Consecutive Integers Relatively Prime to m (1966)
- Doctoral advisors: Dick Lehmer, Russell Lehman

David Breyer Singmaster (14 December 1938 – 13 February 2023) was an American-British mathematician who was emeritus professor of mathematics at London South Bank University, England. He had a huge personal collection of mechanical puzzles and books of brain teasers. He was most famous for being an early adopter and enthusiastic promoter of the Rubik's Cube. His Notes on Rubik's "Magic Cube" which he began compiling in 1979 provided the first mathematical analysis of the Cube as well as providing one of the first published solutions. The book contained his cube notation which allowed the recording of Rubik's Cube moves, and which quickly became the standard.

Singmaster was both a puzzle historian and a composer of puzzles, and many of his puzzles were published in newspapers and magazines. In combinatorial number theory, Singmaster's conjecture states that there is an upper bound on the number of times a number other than 1 can appear in Pascal's triangle.

== Career ==
David Singmaster was a student at the California Institute of Technology in the late 1950s. His intention was to become a civil engineer, but he became interested in chemistry and then physics. However he was thrown out of college in his third year for "lack of academic ability". After a year working, he switched to the University of California, Berkeley. He only became really interested in mathematics in his final year when he took some courses in algebra and number theory. In the autumn semester, his number theory teacher Dick Lehmer posed a prize problem which Singmaster won. In his last semester, his algebra teacher posed a question the teacher didn't know the answer to and Singmaster solved it, eventually leading to two papers. He gained his PhD from Berkeley, in 1966. He taught at the American University of Beirut, and then lived for a while in Cyprus.

Singmaster moved to London in 1970. The "Polytechnic of the South Bank" had been created from a merger of institutions in 1970, and Singmaster became a lecturer in the Department of Mathematical Sciences. His academic interests were in combinatorics and number theory.

In August 1971 he joined an archaeological expedition off the coast of Sicily, acting as photographer. He went off course one day and noticed a timber sticking up out of the sand. This led to the discovery of the Marsala Punic shipwreck.

Around 1972, he attended the Istituto di Matematica in Pisa for a year having won a research scholarship. He was promoted to a Readership (a Research Professorship) at the South Bank Polytechnic in September 1984. The polytechnic college became London South Bank University in 1992, and Singmaster was the professor of mathematics at the "School of Computing, Information Systems and Mathematics". He retired in 1996. He became an honorary research fellow at University College London. He was designated emeritus at London South Bank University in 2020.

== Rubik's Cubes ==
The power of conjugation ... was the last point I understood; I remember lying awake thinking about it, seeing that I could move any four edges into the working locations and realising that this completed the general method for restoring the cube to its original state.

— David Singmaster, Moral and Mathematical Lessons from a Rubik Cube, New Scientist, 1982

Singmaster's association with Rubik's Cubes dates from August 1978, when he saw a Cube (at that time a rarity) at the International Congress of Mathematicians in Helsinki. Some other mathematicians at the conference, including John Conway and Roger Penrose, already had one.

Singmaster quickly acquired a Cube (in exchange for a copy of an M. C. Escher book) and was able to solve it by early September 1978. He said that it took him "two weeks, on and off" to find a general solution for the Cube. He devised his notation for recording moves (now known as the Singmaster notation) in December 1978. In June 1979 he wrote one of the first articles about the Cube in The Observer newspaper.

In October 1979, he self-published his Notes on the "Magic Cube". The booklet contained his mathematical analysis of Rubik's Cube, allowing a solution to be constructed using basic group theory. In August 1980, he published an expanded 5th edition of the book retitled as Notes on Rubik's "Magic Cube". It included the results of his correspondence with other "cubologists", and included details on monotwists, U-flips, Cayley graphs, and wreath products. The book contained his own "step-by-step solution" for the Cube, and it is accepted that he was a pioneer of the general Layer-by-Layer approach for solving the Cube. The book also contained a catalogue of pretty patterns, including his "cube in a cube in a cube" pattern which he had discovered himself "and was very pleased with". In 1981, at the height of the Rubik's Cube craze, the book was republished by Penguin Books, with a US edition by Enslow Publishers. There were also Dutch and Spanish translations. He estimated that he sold around 50,000 to 60,000 copies of his book. Much of the mathematical content of the book was later reworked by Alexander H. Frey in collaboration with Singmaster to create their Handbook of Cubik Math published in 1982.

Singmaster was described as "one of the most enthusiastic and prolific promoters of the Cube". In September 1981, he was said to be devoting "almost 100%" of his time to promoting, reporting, marketing and analysing the Cube. He soon began publishing a quarterly newsletter called the Cubic Circular, which was published between 1981 and 1985.

== Puzzles ==
Singmaster had one of the world's largest collections of books on recreational mathematics which he had accumulated starting in the late 1970s. In 1996, he reported that the collection contained over 4700 works. He also collected books on cartoons, humour, and language. In 2013, his book collection was reported to be "nearly 10,000 items". Many of the books were housed in a library added as an extension to Singmaster's study. He had a huge collection of mechanical puzzles, which he stated in 2002 contained "perhaps 3000 puzzles, of which about 400 are about Rubik's Cube and its variants".

From around 1980 to 1982, he ran his own puzzle company, David Singmaster Ltd, which stocked "over 100 puzzles and books". However, the venture lost him "a fair amount of money" and led to prolonged tax negotiations. He referred to this period of his life as "a massive overdose of cubism".

Singmaster was both a puzzle historian and a composer of puzzles, and he described himself as a "metagrobologist". Many of his puzzles appeared in publications such as BBC Focus, Games & Puzzles, the Los Angeles Times, and the Weekend Telegraph. He published a collection of his puzzles in his 2016 book Problems for Metagrobologists. From around 2006, Singmaster was a director at the New York–based Conjuring Arts Research Center, retiring from the position (becoming Director Emeritus) in 2013. He was instrumental in the re-discovery of one of the world's oldest books on puzzles and magic illusions when he came across a reference to the work in a 19th-century manuscript. The recovered text, De viribus quantitatis (English: On The Powers Of Numbers), was penned by Luca Pacioli, a Franciscan friar who lived around 1500.

== Singmaster's conjecture ==
In combinatorial number theory, Singmaster's conjecture states that there is a finite upper bound on the number of times a number other than 1 can appear in Pascal's triangle. Paul Erdős suspected that the conjecture is true, but thought it would probably be very difficult to prove. The empirical evidence is consistent with the proposition that the smallest upper bound is 8.

== Media appearances ==
In November 1981, Singmaster appeared on the sci-fi-themed BBC puzzle show The Adventure Game. From 1998 to 1999 he was a frequent panelist on the BBC Radio 4 show Puzzle Panel.

== Personal life and death ==
Singmaster was married twice, the second time to Deborah in 1972. They had one daughter, Jessica, adopted in 1976.

Singmaster died on 13 February 2023, at the age of 84.

== Publications ==
=== Books ===
- Notes on Rubik's "Magic Cube", David Singmaster. Enslow Publishers, 1981. ISBN 0-89490-043-9
- Handbook of Cubik Math, by David Singmaster and Alexander H. Frey. The Lutterworth Press, 1982. ISBN 0-7188-2555-1. Publisher's description
- Rubik's Cubic Compendium, by Ernő Rubik and four others. Edited with an Introduction and Afterword by David Singmaster. Oxford University Press, 1987. ISBN 0-19-853202-4
- The Cube: The Ultimate Guide to the World's Bestselling Puzzle, Jerry Slocum, David Singmaster, Wei-Hwa Huang, Dieter Gebhardt, Geert Hellings, Ernő Rubik. Black Dog & Leventhal, 2009. ISBN 157912805X
- Problems for Metagrobologists, David Singmaster, World Scientific Publishing Company, 23 April 2016. ISBN 9814663638
- Adventures in Recreational Mathematics (in 2 Volumes). David Singmaster. World Scientific Publishing Company. (2021) ISBN 9789811225642

=== Reference works ===
- Chronology of Recreational Mathematics by David Singmaster. 1996. (Available online at anduin.eldar.org)
- Chronology of Computing by David Singmaster. 2000. (Available online at the University of Applied Sciences, Darmstadt)
- Sources in Recreational Mathematics: An Annotated Bibliography, David Singmaster. 8th preliminary edition. South Bank University. 2004. (Available online at the Puzzle Museum)
- Mathematical Gazetteer of the British Isles, by David Singmaster. The British Society for the History of Mathematics. 2012. (Available online at the Internet Archive)

=== Newsletters ===
- Cubic Circular magazine published 1981–85 by David Singmaster (available online at Jaap's Puzzle Page)

=== Articles ===
- Moral and Mathematical Lessons from a Rubik Cube by David Singmaster, New Scientist, 23/30 December 1982
- The Unreasonable Utility of Recreational Mathematics by David Singmaster. First European Congress of Mathematics, Paris, July 1992. (Available online at anduin.eldar.org)
- Solution to Meffert's Pyramorphix , by David Singmaster and Andrew Southern. Meffert's Puzzles, 15 May 1997.

== See also ==
- How to solve the Rubik's Cube – Wikibook
