= Isla Grosa =

Island in Spain

Coordinates: 37°43′40″N 0°42′27″W

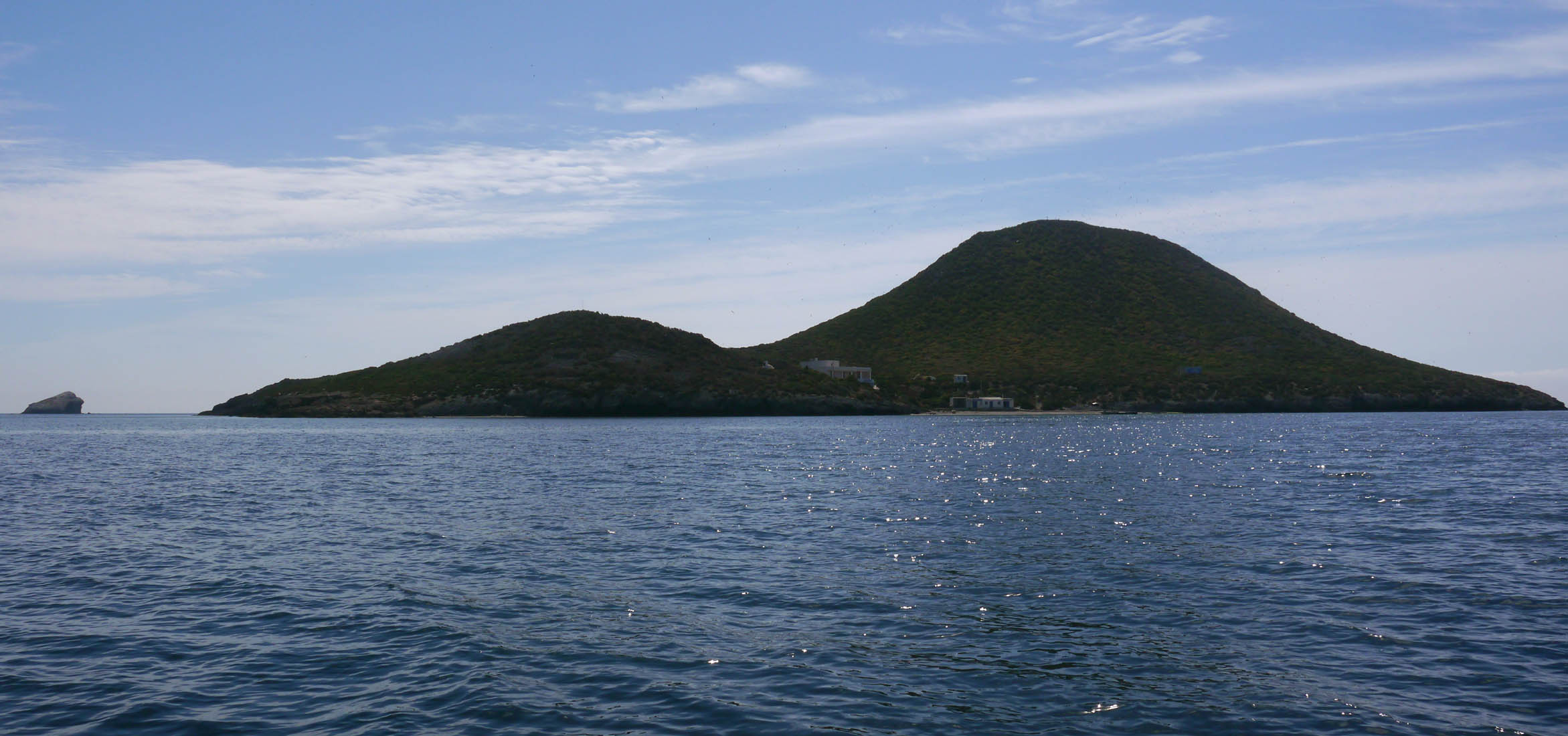
- Interactive map of Isla Grosa

Geography
- Location: Mediterranean Sea
- Archipelago: Islas e Islotes del Litoral Mediterráneo
- Area: 17.5 ha (43 acres)
- Length: 90 m (300 ft)

Administration
- Spain
- Subdivision: Region of Murcia

Demographics
- Population: 0

Isla Grosa is an island in the Mediterranean Sea, belonging to the municipality of San Javier in the Region of Murcia, at a distance of 2.5 km from the northern part of La Manga del Mar Menor. It has an area of 17.5 hectares and is over 90 m high.

To the east of the island there is an islet, also of volcanic origin, called El Farallón.

== Toponymy ==
The name Grosa Island comes from the Catalan: "Grossa". In Spanish: Isla grande (Large Island).

== Geology ==
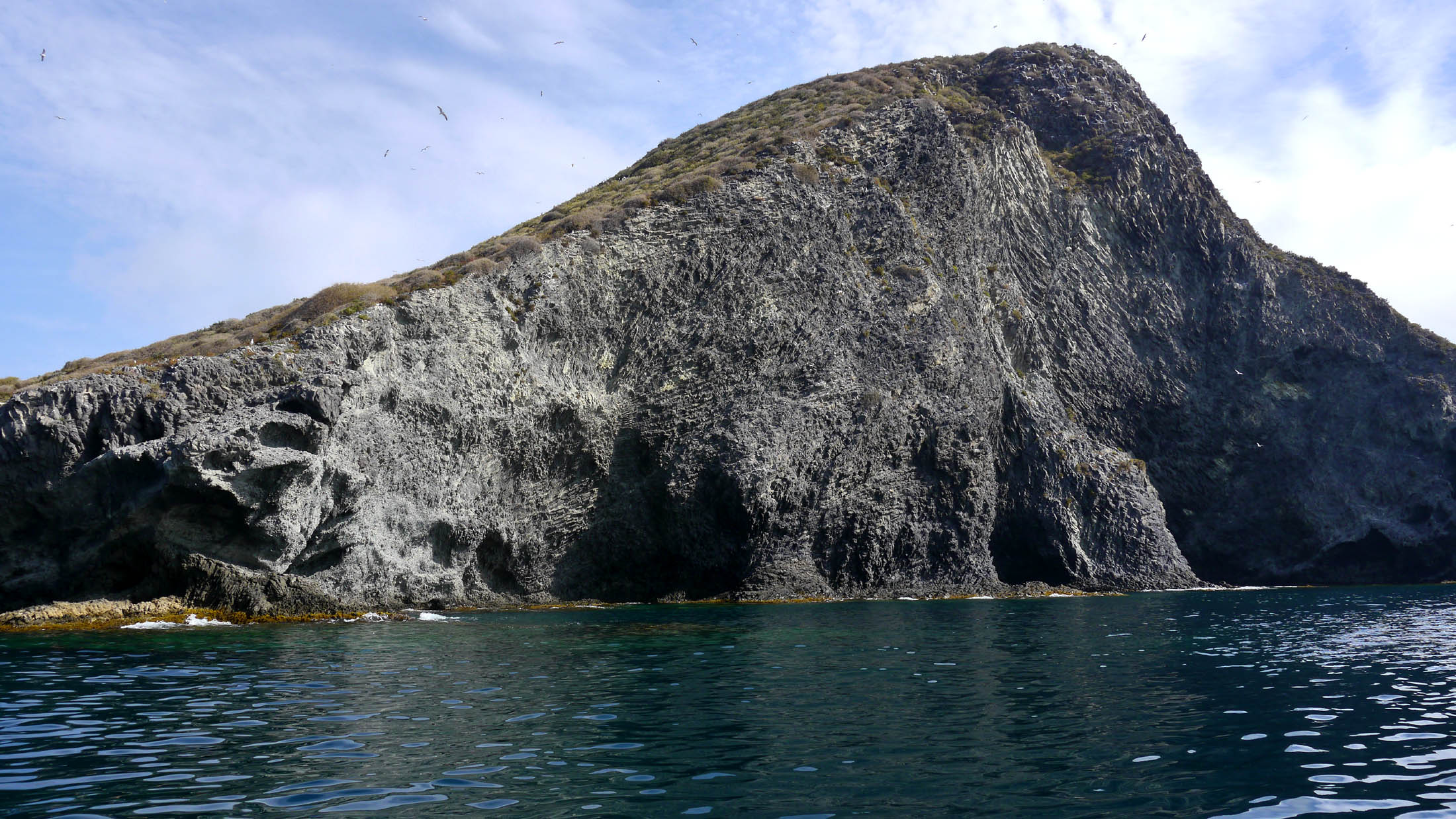
Columnar jointing, remains of volcanic eruptions that can be seen in the cliffs south of the island.

The island Grosa and the islet of Farallón, as well as the islands of the Mar Menor, are remains of the Quaternary volcanism that took place in the whole area of Campo de Cartagena between 7.2 and 6.6 million years ago, during the Miocene.

The island forms a perfect volcanic cone, but quite eroded like most of the Murcian volcanoes, with soils made up of andesites. In the cliffs of the south face of the island are visible examples of columnar jointing produced by the cooling of the volcanic lava in its ascent to the surface.

== Flora ==
The island has unique plant communities made up mainly of cambron (Lycium intricatum), oroval (Withania frutescens) and some nitrophilous species such as sosas.

Under the sea is the most extensive meadow of Posidonia oceanica of the entire coast of the Region of Murcia.

== Fauna ==
Isla Grosa stands out for its ornithological richness. Along with a very large colony of yellow-legged gulls, also nest, among other birds, the European storm petrel, the shag, the peregrine falcon, and Audouin's gull.

=== Audouin's gull conservation ===
The Asociación de Naturalistas del Sureste together with the Consejería de Medio Ambiente de la Región de Murcia, participated in the LIFE programme of Conservación de Larus audouinii en España. Isla Grosa (Murcia) [Conservation of Larus audouinii in Spain. Isla Grosa (Murcia)] (2004–2007) whose objective was to strengthen the population of Audouin's Gull (Larus audouinii) on the island and ensure its conservation. This island is home to the third largest colony of this species in the world, catalogued as globally threatened (SPEC1) by the Species of European Conservation Concern, and is therefore a priority for conservation in Europe.

== Environmental protection ==
The island is protected within the area called Islas e Islotes del Litoral Mediterráneo of the Region of Murcia with the category of natural park, it is also a Special Protection Area for Birds, ZEPA, as well as a Site of Community Importance LIC.

== History ==
The existence of a rock, called "Bajo la Campana" to the east of the stack, a few meters from the surface, constituted for centuries a danger to navigation. Numerous shipwrecks of Phoenician and Roman origin were discovered on its seabed.

The most important site, known as the wreck of the Bajo de la Campana, is that of a Phoenician ship from the seventh century B.C., which sank with a cargo of tin and lead ore ingots, wooden combs, sailor personal effects, and a set of African elephant tusks with Phoenician inscriptions. All the cargo of this ship and the rest of the wrecks discovered under the waters of Isla Grosa are currently on display at the National Museum of Subaquatic Archaeology in Cartagena.

The island was a refuge for Barbary pirates until the 18th century.

The island was a military zone until the year 2000 and was used as a training site for the special units of combat divers and explosives deactivation of the Navy's Diving Center. In 2000 it was ceded to the government of the Region of Murcia for environmental activities.

It has a pier and the only buildings that exist were associated with military activities.

== Gallery ==
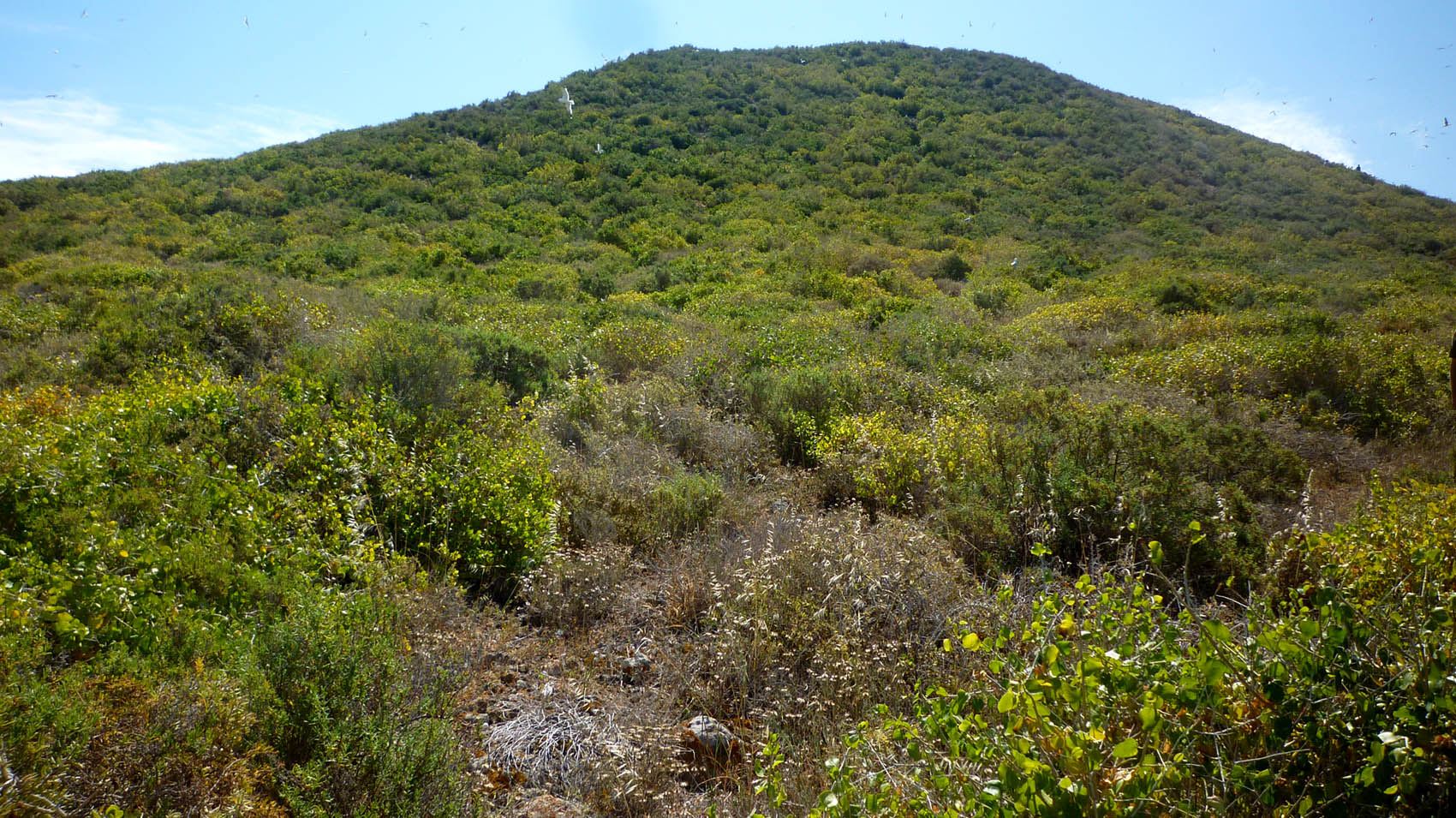
View of the vegetation, mostly composed of orioval (Withania frutescens).

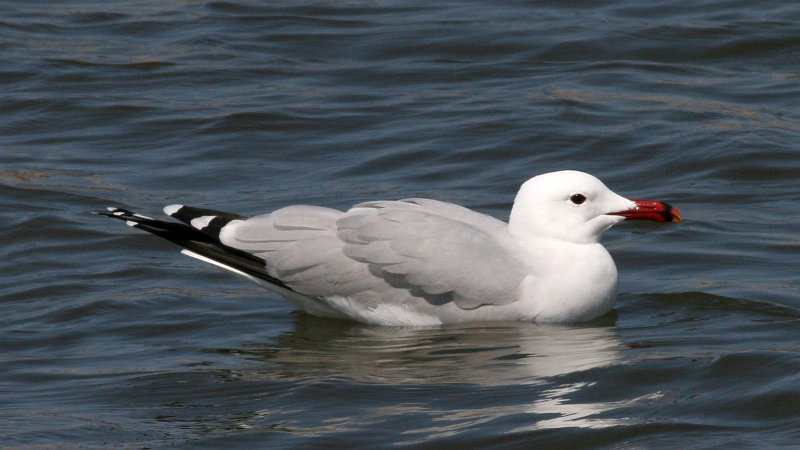
Audouin's gull.

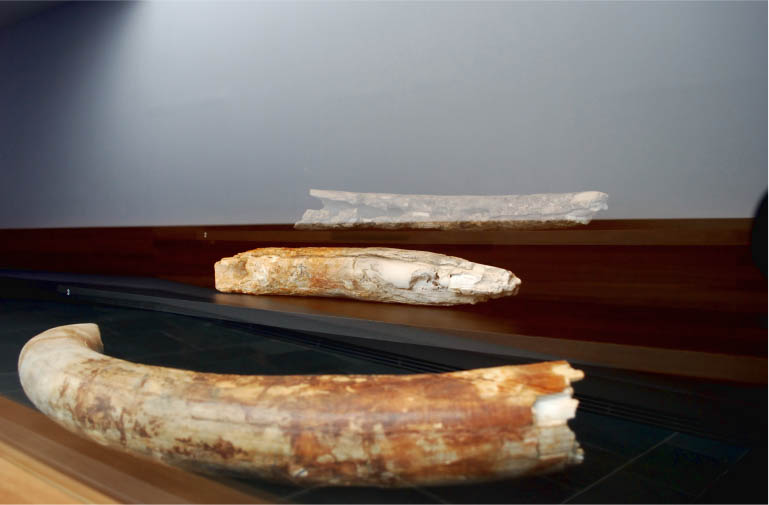
Elephant tusks from the Phoenician wreck of the Bajo de la Campana.

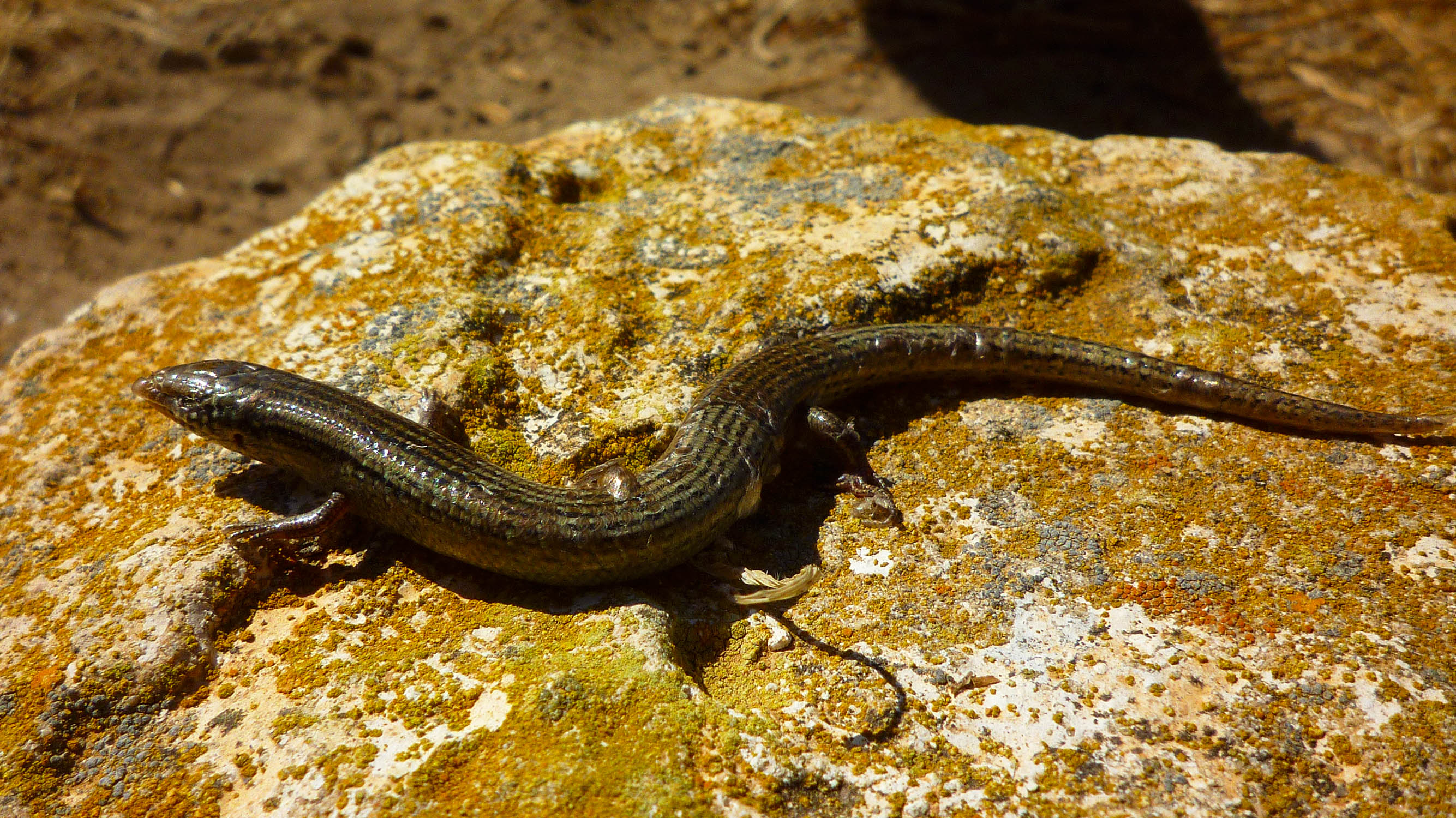
Iberian skink, a reptile species present on Isla Grosa.
