= Gozo Phoenician shipwreck =

Phoenician shipwreck near the coast of Malta

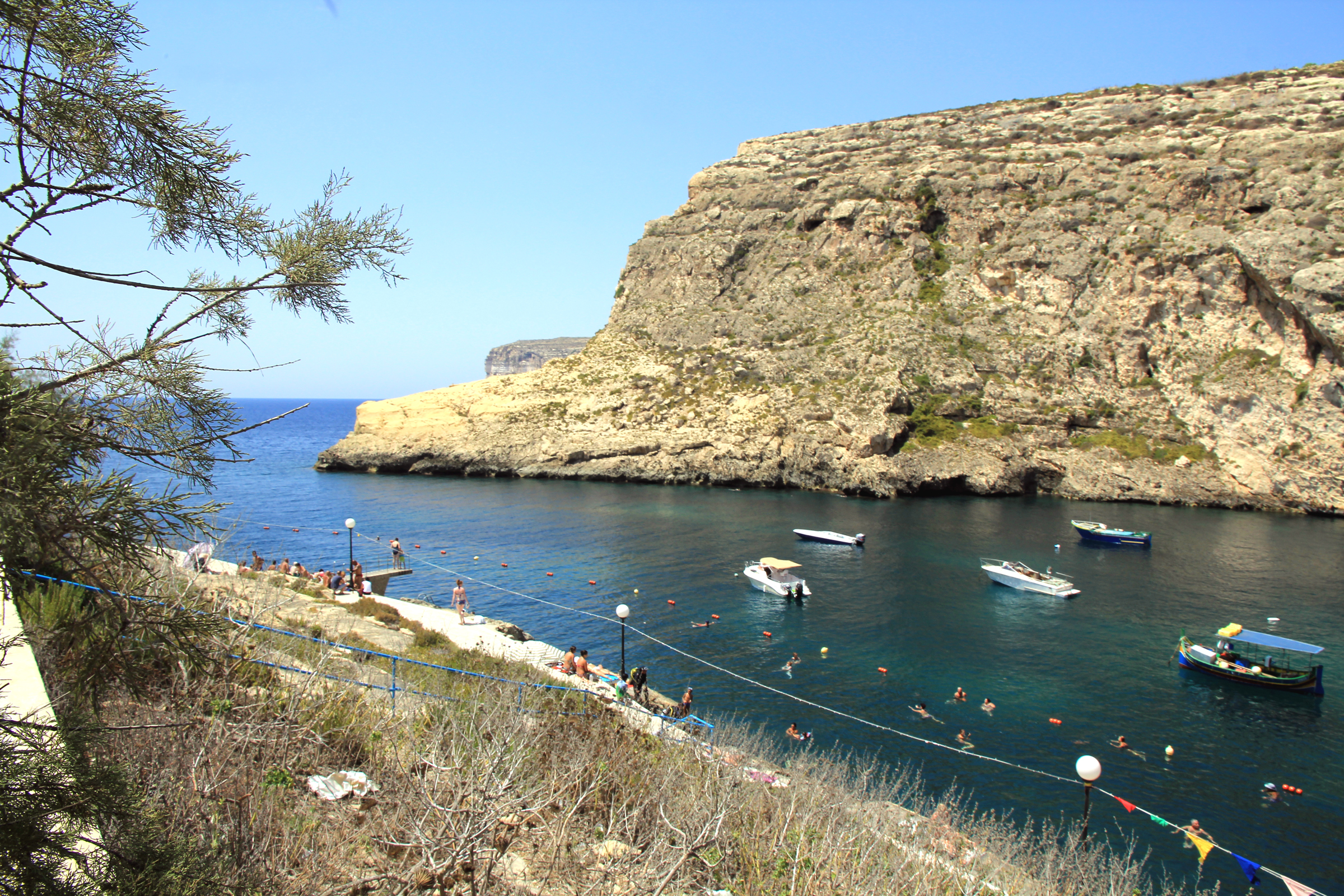
- Gozo's Xlendi Bay, where the shipwreck was discovered.
- Type: Site of a sunken ship
- Periods: Iron Age
- Cultures: Phoenician
- Satellite of: Phoenicia
- Associated with: Crew of the merchant vessel
- Location: Off the coast of Xlendi bay in Gozo
- Region: Bay of Xlendi, off the coast of Gozo.

History
- Built: 7th century BC
- Built by: Phoenicians
- Abandoned: Sank late 7th century BC

Site notes
- Excavation dates: Excavation dives directed by Timmy Gambin since discovery in 2007.
- Archaeologists: Timmy Gambin (Project director); Jean Christophe Sourisseau; Maxine Anastasi
- Condition: Conservation, sampling and study are ongoing
- Owner: Malta

The Gozo Phoenician shipwreck is a seventh-century-BC shipwreck of a Phoenician trade ship lying at a depth of 110 meters (360 ft). The wreck was discovered in 2007 during a sonar survey off the coast of Malta's Gozo island. Since 2014 it has been the object of a multidisciplinary project led by University of Malta along with many other national and international entities. The Gozo shipwreck archaeological excavation is the first maritime archaeological survey to explore shipwrecks with divers beyond a depth of 100 meters (330 ft).

== Historical background ==
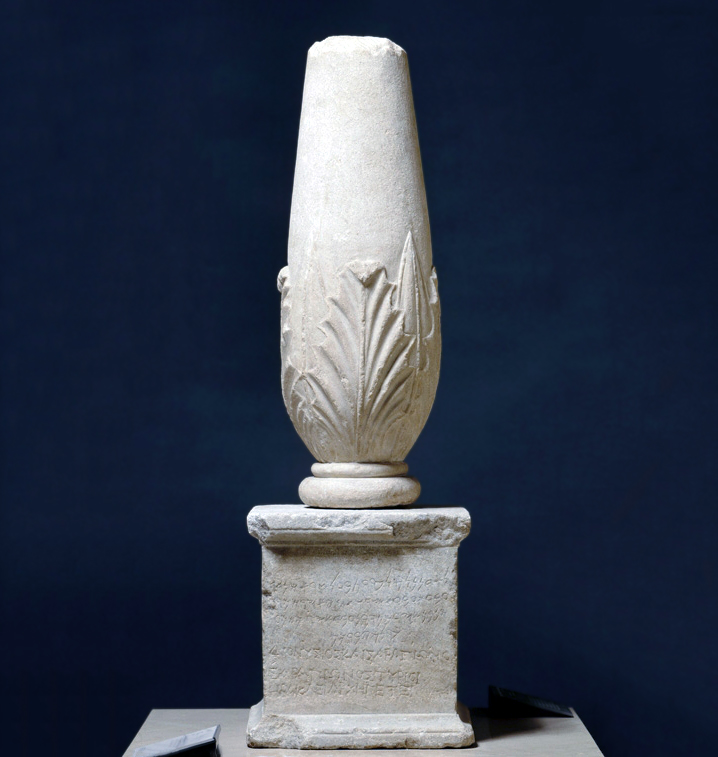
One of two Cippi of Melkart which allowed Jean-Jacques Barthélemy to decipher the Phoenician language.

The Phoenicians, a thalassocratic people known for trading and shipbuilding, had a long-standing presence in, and influence on the history of, the Maltese islands. From the middle of the second millennium BC, the Phoenicians undertook seaborne traffic from their mainland cities on the coast of modern-day Lebanon; their far-reaching trade routes spanned from the British Isles to Mesopotamia. The Phoenicians built trade outposts and colonies throughout the Mediterranean to facilitate the supply and storage of raw materials and goods. Sometime after 1000 BC, Phoenician traders colonized the Maltese islands that were conveniently located at the center of the Mediterranean between Europe and North Africa. They inhabited the area now known as Mdina and its surrounding town of Rabat which they called Maleth. The area came under the control of Carthage after the fall of Tyre in 332 BC. Punic influence remained on the Maltese islands during the early Roman era, as demonstrated by the famous second century BC Cippi of Melqart that were pivotal in deciphering the Phoenician language.

=== Phoenician shipwrecks ===
There are about six Phoenician shipwreck sites datable from the eighth to the sixth century BC in the Mediterranean. Two of these are located off the coast of Palestine/Israel, at a depth of ~400 meters (1,300 ft), three in shallow waters facing the Spanish coast and one in France.

== Location and discovery ==
The Gozo shipwreck was discovered in 2007 by a team led by University of Malta during a seabed survey around 900 meters (3,000 ft) off the coast of Xlendi, on the Maltese island of Gozo. The team detected sonar anomalies at a depth of 110 meters (360 ft), prompting further investigation that led to the discovery of a sunken Phoenician trade ship with its well-preserved cargo dating to the seventh century BC. The Gozo shipwreck archaeological excavation is the first maritime archaeological survey to explore shipwrecks beyond a depth of 100 meters (330 ft). Further archaeological research off the coast of Malta was conducted by the ANR's GROPLAN project in collaboration with the University of Malta and Texas A&M University.

== Description ==
The shipwreck is 12 by 5 meters (39 by 16 ft). Archaeological artifacts are buried under up to 1.8 meters (5.9 ft) of sediment. The ship remains and its upper layer of cargo lay exposed 1 meter (3.3 ft) above a relatively flat seabed of coarse sand; it consists of quern-stones and earthenware containers used to transport wine, olive oil, and other consumables. Quern-stones, used to grind grains, were stored at both ends of the ship; they were discovered in pristine condition, indicating that they were never used and were destined for trade. Studies show that the grinding stones were made from volcanic rock sourced in Pantelleria in Sicily. The wreck site is very well-preserved, save for some minor damage caused by local fishermen's bottom-fishing techniques.

== Cargo and artifacts ==
Digital mapping and high resolution imaging of the site and of the visible artifacts was done in 2014 by an international team of scientists. The survey was performed using a crewed submarine that was deployed to produce a 3D photogrammetric image, which helped identify at least seven types of ceramic vessels. In 2016–2017, exploration of the wreckage resulted in the recovery of 12 objects, including uniquely shaped urns that appear to have been made on the island of Gozo. Divers supervised by maritime archeologists from the Department of Classics and Archaeology at the University of Malta also recovered six intact ceramic objects numerous ceramic shards, among which were Tyrrhenian-style amphorae typical of Italy and western Sicily.

=== Artifact recovery challenges ===
The extraction of artifacts from other parts of the ship proved difficult due to the depth of the shipwreck site. To facilitate artifact surfacing, a mooring dead weight was sunk to anchor the researcher's ship close to the shipwreck site. It took experienced divers eight minutes to reach the site, where they could stay for no longer than 14 minutes; surfacing objects took an additional two and a half hours.

== Conservation ==
In June 2021, Maltese culture minister José Herrera discussed options to lift the shipwreck from the bottom of the sea, and exhibit it at the planned Gozo Museum or another, standalone museum. Another option the minister discussed is to leave the ship in place as an underwater tourist attraction.

== See also ==
- Archaeology of shipwrecks
- List of surviving ancient ships
- Marsala Ship
- Uluburun shipwreck
