= Singmaster's conjecture =

Conjecture in combinatorial number theory

Unsolved problem in mathematics
Is there some constant N such that every entry (apart from 1) of Pascal's triangle appears fewer than N times?
More unsolved problems in mathematics

Singmaster's conjecture is a conjecture in combinatorial number theory, named after the British mathematician David Singmaster who proposed it in 1971. It says that there is a finite upper bound on the multiplicities of entries in Pascal's triangle (other than the number 1, which appears infinitely many times). It is clear that the only number that appears infinitely many times in Pascal's triangle is 1, because any other number x can appear only within the first x + 1 rows of the triangle.

== Statement ==
Let N(a) be the number of times the number a > 1 appears in Pascal's triangle. In big O notation, the conjecture is:

$$N(a) = O(1).$$

In other words, there exists a natural number $M$ such that:

$$N(a) \le M\ \qquad ~ \mathsf{\ for\ all\ } ~ \quad a.$$

== Known bound ==
Singmaster (1971) showed that

$$N(a) = O(\log a).$$

Abbott, Erdős, and Hanson (1974) (see References) refined the estimate to:

$$N(a) = O\left(\frac{\log a}{\log \log a}\right).$$

The best currently known (unconditional) bound is

$$N(a) = O\left(\frac{(\log a)(\log \log \log a)}{(\log \log a)^3}\right),$$

and is due to Kane (2007). Abbott, Erdős, and Hanson note that, conditional on Cramér's conjecture on gaps between consecutive primes,

$$N(a) = O\left( (\log a)^{2/3+\varepsilon}\right)$$

holds for every $\varepsilon > 0$.

Singmaster (1975) showed that the Diophantine equation

$${n+1 \choose k+1} = {n \choose k+2}$$

has infinitely many solutions for the two variables n, k. It follows that there are infinitely many triangle entries of multiplicity at least 6: For any non-negative i, a number a with six appearances in Pascal's triangle is given by either of the above two expressions with

$$n = F_{2i+2} F_{2i+3} - 1,$$

$$k = F_{2i} F_{2i+3} - 1,$$

where F_{j} is the jth Fibonacci number (indexed according to the convention that F_{0} = 0 and F_{1} = 1). The above two expressions locate two of the appearances; two others appear symmetrically in the triangle with respect to those two; and the other two appearances are at ${a \choose 1}$ and ${a \choose a-1}.$

== Elementary examples ==
- 2 appears just once; all larger positive integers appear more than once;
- 3, 4, 5 each appear two times; infinitely many numbers appear exactly twice;
- all odd prime numbers appear two times;
- 6 appears three times, as do all central binomial coefficients except for 1 and 2;
  (it is in principle not excluded that such a coefficient would appear five, seven, or more times, but no such example is known)
- all numbers of the form ${p \choose 2}$ for prime $p>3$ appear four times;
- Infinitely many appear exactly six times, including each of the following:

$$120 = {120 \choose 1} ={120 \choose 119} = {16 \choose 2} ={16 \choose 14} = {10 \choose 3} ={10 \choose 7}$$

$$210 = {210 \choose 1} ={210 \choose 209} = {21 \choose 2} ={21 \choose 19} = {10 \choose 4}={10 \choose 6}$$

$$1540 = {1540 \choose 1} ={1540 \choose 1539} = {56 \choose 2} ={56 \choose 54} = {22 \choose 3} = {22 \choose 19}$$

$$7140 = {7140 \choose 1} ={7140 \choose 7139} = {120 \choose 2} ={120 \choose 118} = {36 \choose 3} = {36 \choose 33}$$

$$11628 = {11628 \choose 1} = {11628 \choose 11627} = {153 \choose 2} = {153 \choose 151} = {19 \choose 5} = {19 \choose 14}$$

$$24310 = {24310 \choose 1} = {24310 \choose 24309} = {221 \choose 2} = {221 \choose 219} = {17 \choose 8} = {17 \choose 9}$$

The next number in Singmaster's infinite family (given in terms of Fibonacci numbers), and the next smallest number to occur six or more times, is $a = 61218182743304701891431482520$:

$$a = {a \choose 1} = {a \choose a-1} = {104 \choose 39} = {104 \choose 65} = {103 \choose 40} = {103 \choose 63}$$

- The smallest number to appear eight times – indeed, the only number known to appear eight times – is 3003, which is also a member of Singmaster's infinite family of numbers with multiplicity at least 6:

$$3003 = {3003 \choose 1} = {78 \choose 2} = {15 \choose 5} = {14 \choose 6} = {14 \choose 8} = {15 \choose 10} = {78 \choose 76} = {3003 \choose 3002}$$

It is not known whether infinitely many numbers appear eight times, nor even whether any other numbers than 3003 appear eight times.

The number of times n appears in Pascal's triangle is

∞, 1, 2, 2, 2, 3, 2, 2, 2, 4, 2, 2, 2, 2, 4, 2, 2, 2, 2, 3, 4, 2, 2, 2, 2, 2, 2, 4, 2, 2, 2, 2, 2, 2, 4, 4, 2, 2, 2, 2, 2, 2, 2, 2, 4, 2, 2, 2, 2, 2, 2, 2, 2, 2, 4, 4, 2, 2, 2, 2, 2, 2, 2, 2, 2, 4, 2, 2, 2, 3, 2, 2, 2, 2, 2, 2, 2, 4, 2, 2, 2, 2, 2, 4, 2, 2, 2, 2, 2, 2, 4, 2, 2, 2, 2, 2, 2, 2, 2, 2, 2, 2, 2, 2, 4, 2, 2, 2, 2, 2, 2, 2, 2, 2, 2, 2, 2, 2, 2, 6, 2, 2, 2, 2, 2, 4, 2, 2, ... (sequence A003016 in the OEIS)

By Abbott, Erdős, and Hanson (1974), the number of integers no larger than x that appear more than twice in Pascal's triangle is $O(x^{1/2})$.

The smallest natural number greater than 1 that appears (at least) n times in Pascal's triangle is

2, 3, 6, 10, 120, 120, 3003, 3003, ... (sequence A062527 in the OEIS)

The numbers which appear at least five times in Pascal's triangle are

1, 120, 210, 1540, 3003, 7140, 11628, 24310, 61218182743304701891431482520, ... (sequence A003015 in the OEIS)

Of these, the ones in Singmaster's infinite family are

1, 3003, 61218182743304701891431482520, ... (sequence A090162 in the OEIS)

== Open questions ==
It is not known whether any number appears more than eight times, nor whether any number besides 3003 appears that many times. The conjectured finite upper bound could be as small as 8, but Singmaster thought it might be 10 or 12. It is also unknown whether any numbers appear exactly five or seven times.

== See also ==
- Binomial coefficient
