= Marsala Punic shipwreck =

3rd-century BC shipwreck off Sicily

Marsala punic shipwreck
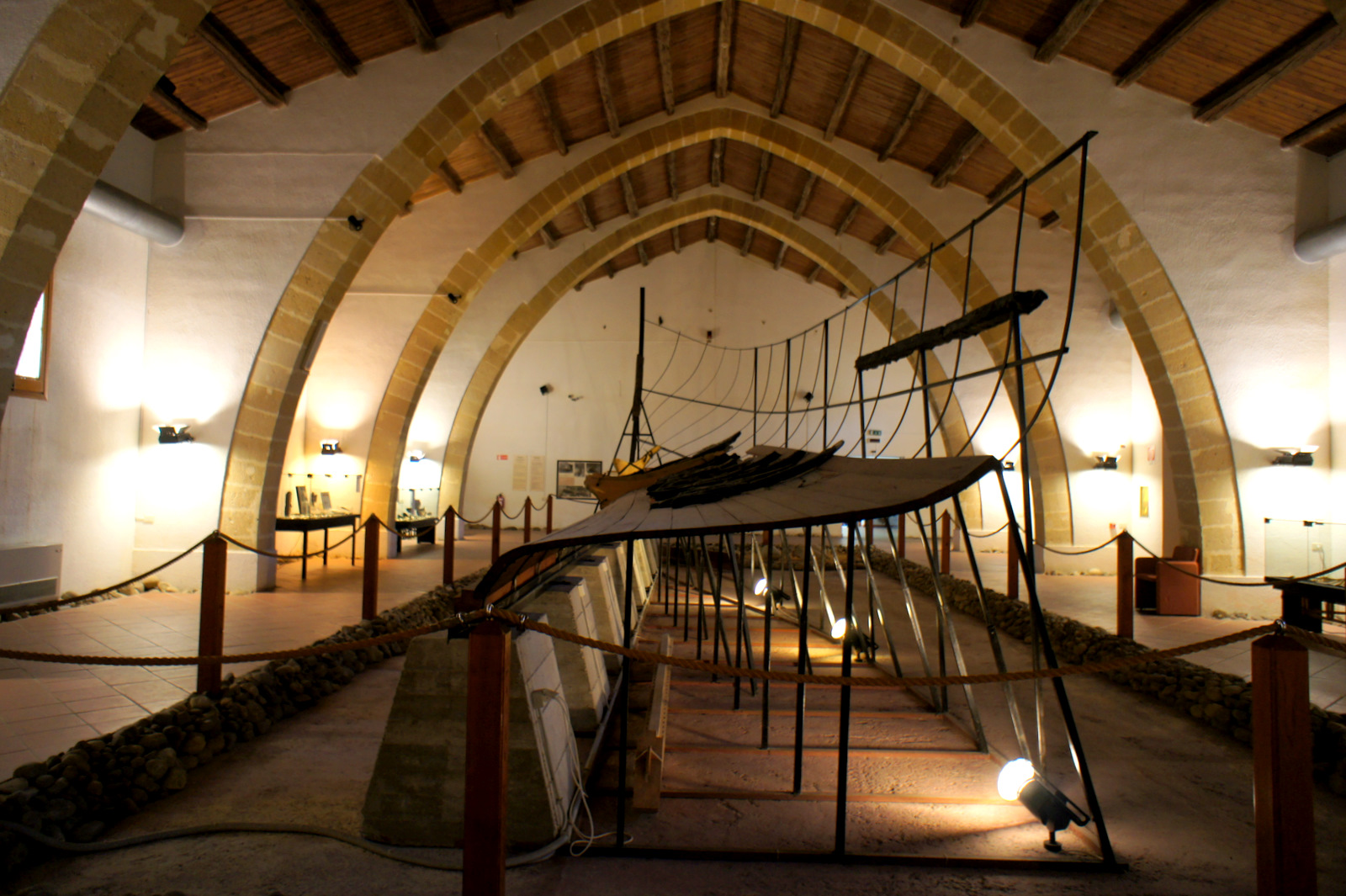
- View of the remains of the Marsala Punic Ship at the Regional Archaeological Museum Baglio Anselmi

- Location of the Regional Archaeological Museum Baglio Anselmi
- 37.80115°N 12.426615°E
- Type: Site of a sunken ship
- Periods: Classical antiquity
- Cultures: Punic
- Satellite of: Carthage
- Associated with: Crew of military and merchant vessels
- Location: Punta Scario

History
- Built: 3rd century BC
- Built by: Punic people
- Abandoned: Believed to have sunk in the mid 3rd century BC

Site notes
- Excavation dates: 1971–1974
- Archaeologists: Honor Frost
- Discovered: 1971
- Condition: Conserved
- Owner: Italy

The Marsala Punic shipwreck is a third-century-BC shipwreck of two Punic ships. The wreck was discovered in 1969, off the shore of Isola Lunga, not far from Marsala on the western coast of Sicily. It was excavated from 1971 onwards. The excavation, led by Honor Frost and her team, lasted four years and revealed a substantial portion of the hull structure.

The first, more significant, wreck turned out to be an ancient military galley that was named the Marsala Punic Ship. The second ship, dubbed Sister Ship, was identified as a merchant vessel. Inscriptions in Punic script have made it possible to attribute the remains unquestionably to the Punics. Upon its discovery, the Marsala shipwreck was the sole surviving wreck from its era. The Marsala Punic Ship is believed to have played a role in the momentous Battle of the Aegates in 241 BC. The ship's state of preservation, unique features, and artifacts offered a glimpse into the advanced production techniques, and daily life aboard ancient warships. The study of the wreck has advanced current knowledge of the Carthaginian navy at the time of the First Punic War and validated some information provided by ancient sources.

== Discovery and location ==
In 1969, Diego Boninni, the captain of a commercial dredge operating off the shore of Isola Lunga, not far from Marsala on the western coast of Sicily, discovered underwater formations covered with Posidonia seagrass. Boninni showed some of his discoveries to Eduardo Lipari, a local whose family was connected to archeological excavations in the area. That same year, Boninni and Lipari took diver-archaeologist Gerhard Kapitän and British pioneer underwater archaeologist Honor Frost to the site of the underwater heaps. Frost and Kapitän returned to the area to further investigate what they had identified as ship ballast piles, evidence of ancient marine wrecks.

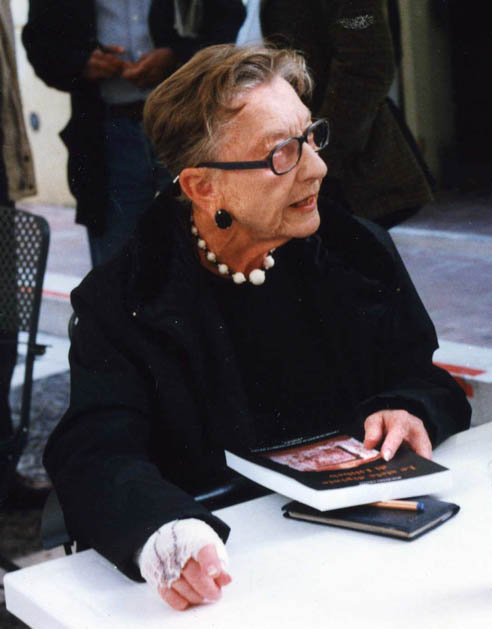
Pioneer marine archaeologist Honor Frost

One of the wrecks surveyed in 1970 yielded a spearhead discovered within the ballast pile, along with a warship-type anchor found nearby. Other iron objects were also found, including what was interpreted to be a corvus, a military boarding device that played a notable role during the First Punic War. Based on the collective discoveries, Frost inferred that the site potentially represents the wreck of a warship. Likewise, the presence of other ballast piles in the vicinity suggested that the sinkings in the area were likely the result of acts of war. Frost returned in 1971 to the "Anchor and Spearhead Wreck" but her team's soundings did not find any wooden ship remains. In 1971, expedition photographer David Singmaster signaled an off-course find to Frost at a depth of 2.5 m (8.2 ft). He had found two new piles of ballast stones, with a large stern timber emerging from the sand in between. More wooden remains of the ancient vessel were found, some of which were inscribed with Punic letters. The Punic letters were used as numerals and were painted at intervals along the keel to the positions of the ribs. The vessel was dubbed the Marsala Punic Ship. The Sicilian authorities and the British School at Rome mandated archaeologist Honor Frost to direct the excavations which were carried out over the course of four successive annual campaigns. Annual reports were published in the International Journal of Nautical Archaeology. The final report was published by the Accademia Nazionale dei Lincei in 1981. The excavation was carried out off the shore of Isola Lunga, north of the Marsala, a town known in the ancient era as Lilybaeum and founded by the Carthaginians after the destruction of Motya in 397 B.C. In 1974, the stern and very few other remains of another ship were discovered 70 m (230 ft) south of the Marsala Punic Ship. The second vessel was named Sister Ship.

== Description ==
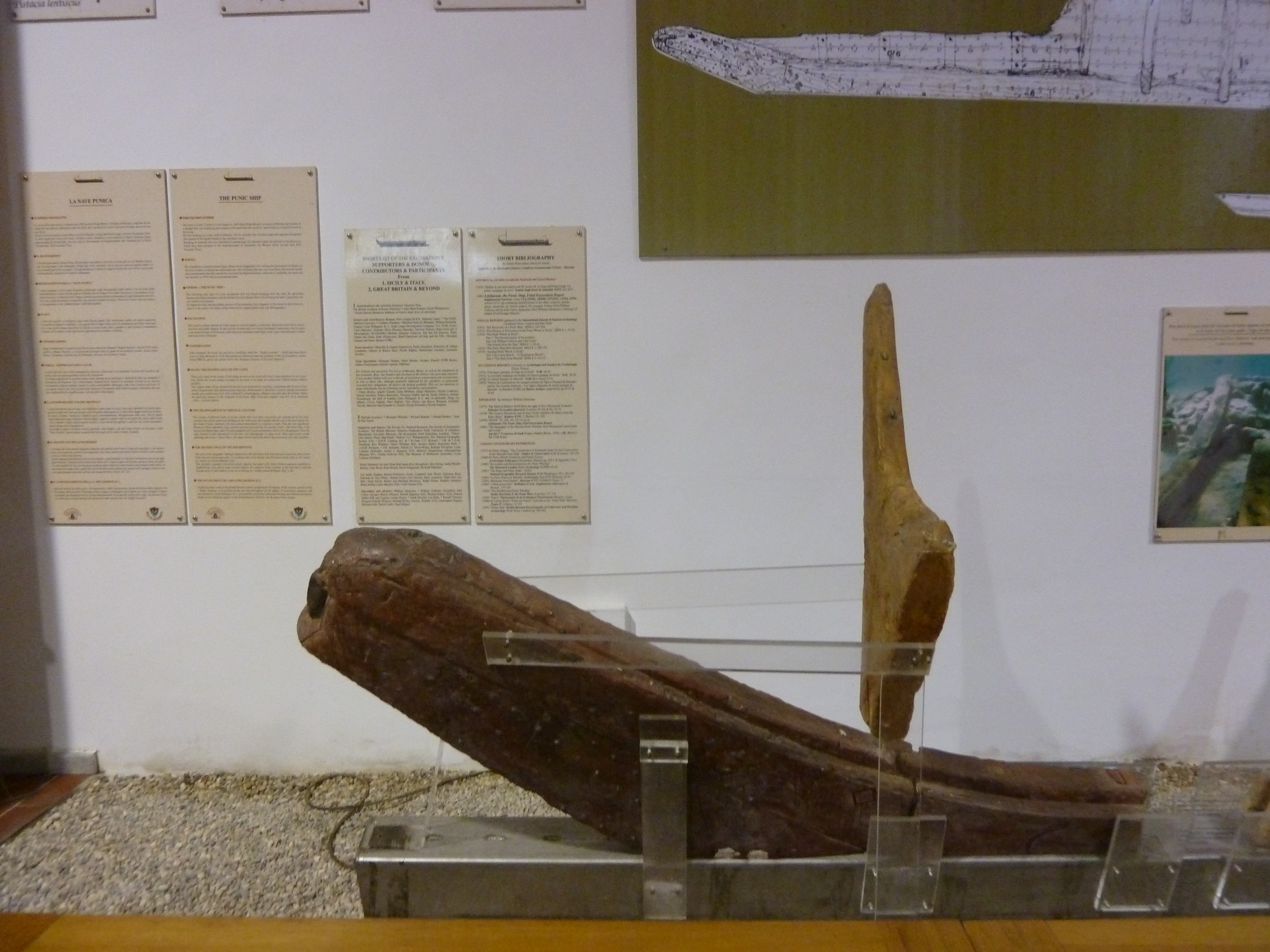
Punic Ship keel detail

The reconstructed Marsala Punic Ship retains the ship's original dimensions and materials. The ship was constructed from pine and aceraceous wood, materials that did not respond well to chemical preservation treatments. The Marsala Punic Ship boasted a straight keel measuring 30 m (98 ft), making the overall length nearly 35 m (115 ft), with a width of 4.8 m (16 ft), including the side gangways. Estimated at around 120 metric tons. The excavation findings and the shape of the vessel indicated that the remains were not from a merchant ship. Merchant ships typically have features designed for storing goods or drinking water, whereas the crockery discovered at the site was meant for individual use. The ship was found to contain various types of butchered meats, such as deer, horse, beef, mutton, goat, and pork. Additionally, fragments of marijuana stalks were found, presumably for the oarsmen to chew on. The archaeologists made several other discoveries, including fragments of a basket, a rope, and human bones, suggesting that a person had been trapped. The presence of ballast confirmed the military nature of the Marsala Punic Ship. The vessel was sheathed below the waterline with lead.

The ship's hydrodynamic features demonstrate the maritime expertise inherited from the Phoenicians, renowned innovators in shipbuilding who influenced both the Greeks and Romans. Additionally, it is believed that despite its trireme dimensions, the Marsala Ship was a quadrireme modeled after the fast and agile Rhodian galleys. In 264 BC, the Romans seized Phoenician quinqueremes that ran aground. Polybius reports that the ship served as a model for the Romans' fleet ships; they realized the additional advantage of using Phoenician joints in shipbuilding, as the lumber used in edge-joined ship strakes does not have to be dried. Early in the First Punic War in 260 BC, the Phoenician shipbuilding technology allowed the Romans to build a fleet of 100 quinqueremes within two months. The Marsala wreck was entirely conceived and realized ‘shell first’ because of the presence of bolted floor timbers.

=== Sister Ship ===
From the first ship, archaeologists discovered the remains of 12 m (39 ft) of keel on the stern and port side. On the bow of the second ship, they discovered the remains of a wooden spur and elements of Punic calligraphy. The naval ram of the Sister Ship was discovered and reconstructed: unlike the trident-shaped rams depicted on Carthaginian coins, it is in the shape of a 3-metre-long upward curving beak, made of metal-coated wood. A thick, resinous coating covered the wood of the remains of the ram, along with nails and fragments of a copper plate. Barely emerging from the water, it was connected to the bow by a novel fastener designed to break on impact during ramming. This mechanism would enable the attacking vessel to easily disengage from its adversary's battered side and stay afloat.

== Research ==
Based on carbon-14 dating of wood fragments, the ships were estimated to be from around 235 ±65 BC. According to Frost, the paleography of the Punic inscriptions found on the timbers of the wrecks indicate the ships were built between 300 and 260 BC. These inscriptions made it possible for Frost to attribute the remains unquestionably to the Carthaginians. The Marsala ships may have played a role in the momentous Battle of the Aegates in 241 BC, as there is no other recorded battle that could explain the presence of shipwrecks along the shore at Isola Lunga. This battle saw the Roman fleet pitted against the Carthaginian fleet, resulting in a resounding victory for Rome and marking a decisive moment in the First Punic War. There is disagreement among specialists regarding the role of the recovered ships. Honor Frost views the ships as having been combat vessels. On the other hand, Franco-Tunisian historian and archaeologist Hédi Dridi, following Piero Bartoloni's perspective, believes that the recovered ships served as scout vessels, responsible for surveillance or acting as a link between larger ships engaged in direct combat. This interpretation is particularly influenced by the absence of bronze rostrums on the ships. A belt of corrugation on the waterline is still not fully understood. Within the ancient Mediterranean family of smooth-skinned, mortise-and-tenon-built, "round" hulls, examined in considerable number since the 1950s, this Punic hull stands out with its unique features, notably its shape: it represents a " long" vessel, a characteristic that holds significant historical and archaeological value.

=== Resurfacing and conservation ===
While the Marsala Punic Ship was raised and displayed at the Regional Archaeological Museum Baglio Anserlmi in Marsala, the Sister Ship was reburied on the seafloor. The remains of the Marsala Punic Ship were used to reconstruct a metal framework of the best-preserved section of the hull in 1979. However, due to inadequate protection, the ship suffered from corrosion, and the ravages of the elements while housed in a simple 19th-century wine shed. In 1980, a temporary measure was taken by covering the ship with a plastic tarp. Concerns over the deteriorating supports and wooden elements led the archaeological community to demand better preservation conditions. With the assistance of Danish experts, including Professor Ole Crumlin Pedersen and the Regional Conservation Center in Palermo, another reconstruction was carried out. Pedersen, having experience in reconstructing Viking ships found in Skuldelev, Denmark, collaborated on the project. In 2019, a 3D documentation project of the Marsala Punic Ship successfully created high-resolution digital records of the Marsala Punic Ship, its associated timbers, and the original molds from the excavation. The laser scans and photogrammetry data provided valuable insights into the ship's current condition and stress points.

=== Significance ===
The shapes of the remains of the ships complement each other, in particular with a ram, and provide a unique document of the Carthaginian navy during the First Punic War. The information supplied by the excavation and the study of the Marsala Punic shipwreck corroborated naval depictions in Punic numismatics and Carthage tophet steles. Painted markings and traces of two alphabetic sequences discovered on the ships' hulls, along with its Phoenician origin, indicate a standardized prefabricated components production process, explaining the rapid deployment of Carthaginian military fleets. Each plank of the keel was marked with an alphabetic sign intended for assembly; Punic words have also been identified. The inscriptions were found on the inner side of the keel and the hull. Each sign indicated the position of each piece. The ship's components were assembled by carpenters after being prepared by joiners. This archaeological discovery corroborates ancient historians' observations regarding the remarkable speed of construction of these Punic ships, which was previously considered unlikely. Appian reported that during the Third Punic War around 147 B.C., despite the Roman siege of Carthage, the Carthaginians built several dozen triremes and quinqueremes. Since the discovery in Marsala, modern historians have been provided with further evidence supporting the assertion regarding the remarkable speed of construction of these Punic ships. This construction system validated Polybius' account of the Romans capturing a Punic ship and using it as a model to build their own fleet in record time.

== See also ==
- List of surviving ancient ships
- Gozo Phoenician shipwreck – Phoenician shipwreck near the coast of Malta
- Uluburun shipwreck – 14th-century BCE Mediterranean shipwreck
- Motya – Ancient city on San Pantaleo Island, Italy
- Mazara del Vallo Roman shipwreck
