= Orthodox Church of Finland =

Autonomous Eastern Orthodox archdiocese

Orthodox Church in Finland

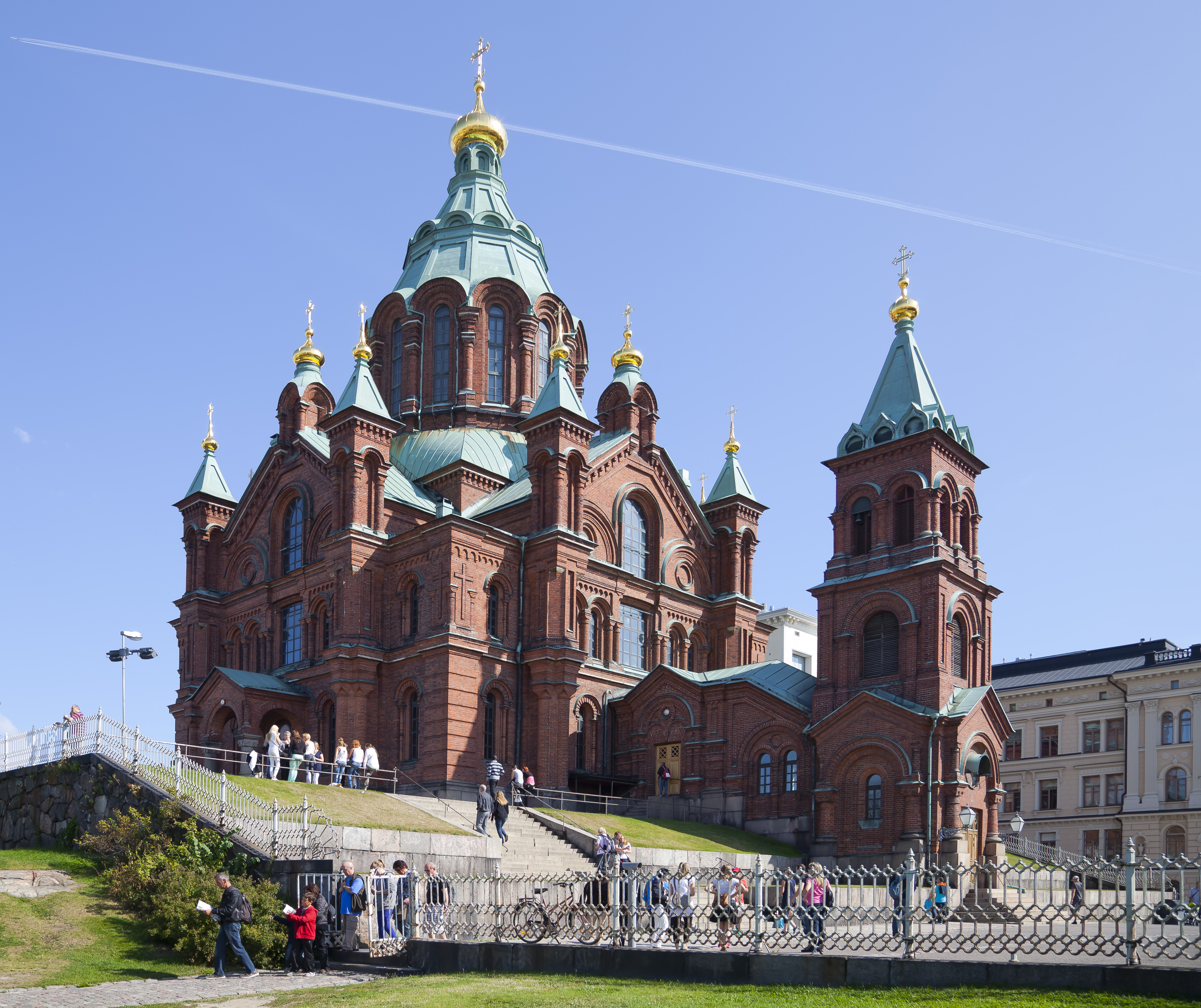
- Uspenski Cathedral in Helsinki
- Type: National church
- Classification: Eastern Orthodox
- Polity: Episcopal
- Primate: Elia of Helsinki and all Finland
- Bishops: 5
- Priests: c. 140
- Dioceses: 3
- Parishes: 21
- Monasteries: 2
- Language: Finnish, Swedish, Skolt Sami, Church Slavonic, Greek
- Headquarters: Helsinki, Finland
- Territory: Finland
- Independence: 1921 (Autonomy granted from Moscow Patriarchate); 1923 (Autonomy granted from Ecumenical Patriarchate)
- Recognition: Autonomy granted and recognised in 1923 by the Ecumenical Patriarchate of Constantinople and in 1957 by the Russian Orthodox Church.
- Members: 58,139
- Official website: www.ort.fi

The Orthodox Church in Finland (Finnish: Suomen ortodoksinen kirkko, lit. 'Finnish orthodox church'; Swedish: Ortodoxa kyrkan i Finland, lit. 'Orthodox church in Finland') is an autonomous Eastern Orthodox archdiocese of the Ecumenical Patriarchate of Constantinople. The church has a legal position as a national church in the country, along with the Evangelical Lutheran Church of Finland.

With its roots in the medieval Novgorodian missionary work in Karelia, the Orthodox Church of Finland was a part of the Russian Orthodox Church until 1923. Today the church has three dioceses and 55,439 members in Finland, accounting for almost one percent of the native population of Finland. The parish of Helsinki has the most adherents. There are also 2,700 members living abroad.

== Structure and organization ==
Along with the Evangelical Lutheran Church of Finland, the Orthodox Church of Finland has a special position in Finnish law. The church is considered to be a Finnish entity of public nature. The external form of the church is regulated by an Act of Parliament, while the spiritual and doctrinal matters of the church are legislated by the central synod of the church. The church has the right to tax its members and corporations owned by its members. Previously under the Russian Orthodox Church, it has been an autonomous Orthodox archdiocese of the Patriarchate of Constantinople since 1923.

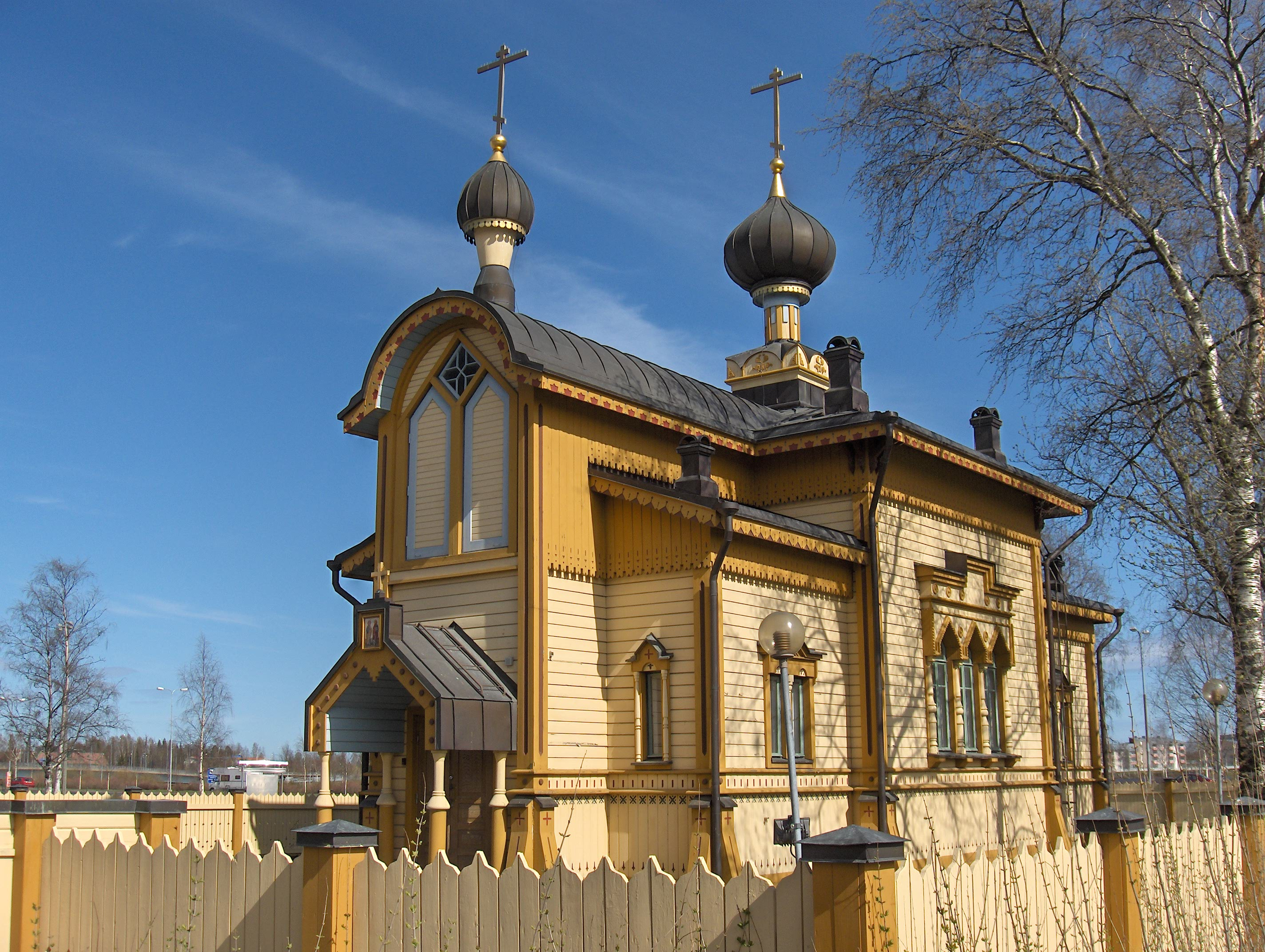
The wooden church of Sts. Peter and Paul in Tornio, built in 1884.

The Orthodox Church of Finland is divided into three dioceses (hiippakunta), each with a subdivision of parishes (seurakunta). There are 21 parishes with 140 priests and 58,139 members in total, of whom 55,439 are in Finland. The number of church members has been steadily growing for several years. A convent and a monastery also operate within the church.

The central legislative organ of the church is the central synod which is formed of:

- the bishops and coadjutor bishops,
- eleven priests
- three cantors
- eighteen laymen and laywomen

The priests and cantors elect their representatives on a diocesan basis, using the plurality election method. The lay representatives are elected indirectly. The nominations for representatives are made by the parish councils which also elect the electors who then elect the lay representatives to the central synod. The central synod elects the bishops and is responsible for the economy and the general doctrine of the church.

The two executive bodies of the church central administration are the synod of bishops, responsible for the doctrinal and foreign affairs of the church, and the church administrative council (kirkollishallitus), responsible for day-to-day management of the church.

The parishes are governed by the rector and the parish council, which is elected in a secret election. All full-age members of the parish are eligible to vote and to be elected to the parish council. The members of the parish have the right to refrain from being elected to a position of trust of the parish only if they are over 60 years of age, or have served at least eight years in a position of trust. The parish council elects the parish board, which is responsible for the day-to-day affairs of the parish.

Financially, the church is independent of the state budget. The parishes are financed by the taxes paid by their members. The central administration is financed through the contributions of the parishes. The central synod decides yearly the amount of contributions the parishes are required to make.

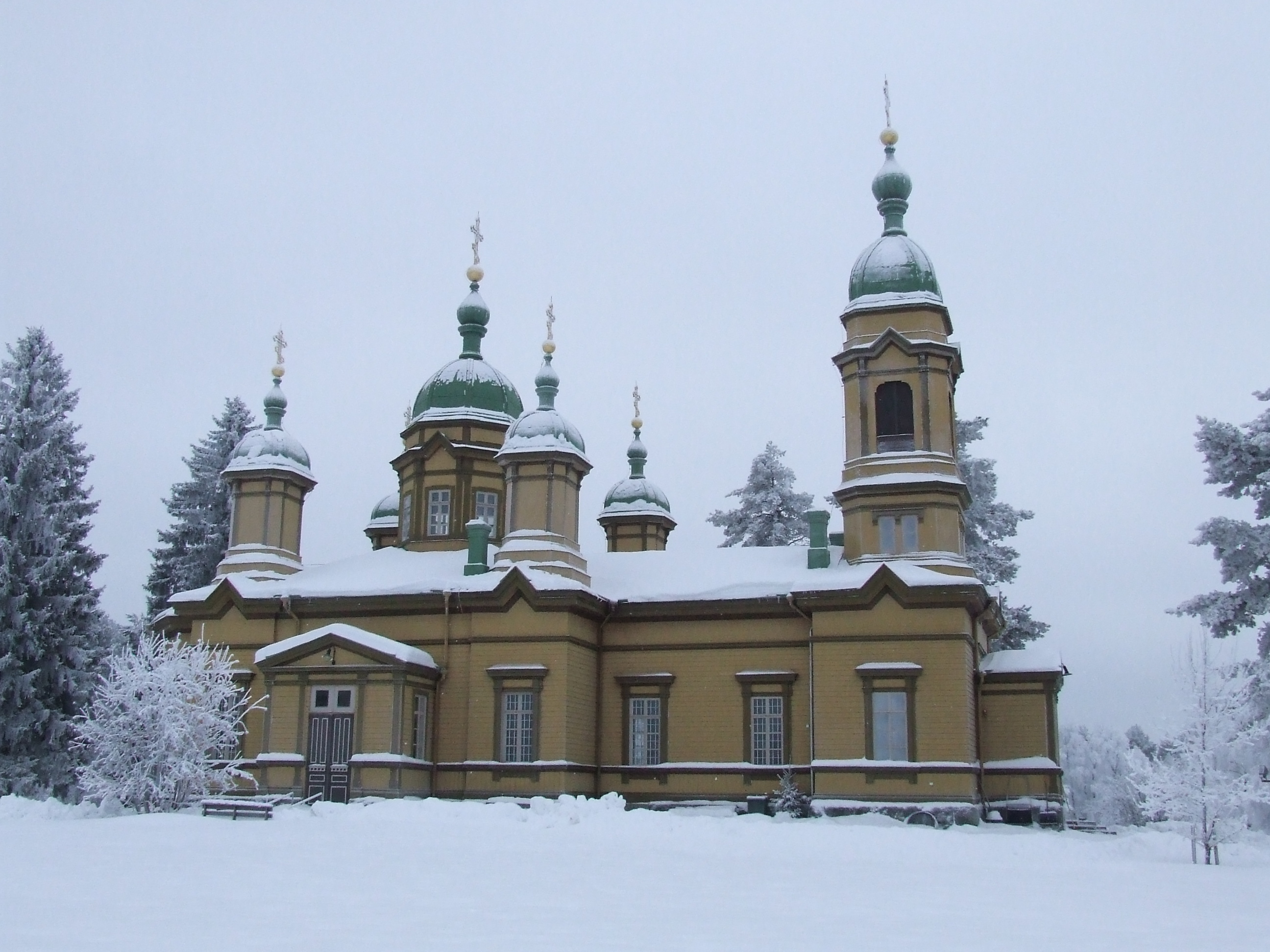
Church of Saint Prophet Elijah, Ilomantsi

The special status of the Orthodox church is most visible in the administrative processes. The church is required to conform with the general administrative law and the decisions of its bodies may be appealed against in the regional administrative courts. However, the court is limited to reviewing the formal legality of the decision. It may not overturn an ecclesiastical decision on the basis of its unreasonableness. The decisions of the synod of bishops and the central synod are not subject to the oversight of the administrative courts. In contrast, similar legal oversight of private religious communities is pursued by the district courts.

Finnish law protects the absolute priest–penitent privilege. A bishop, priest or deacon of the church may not divulge information he has heard during confession or spiritual care. The identity of the sinner may not be revealed for any purpose. However, if the priest hears about a crime that is about to be committed, he is responsible for informing the authorities in such manner that privilege is not endangered.

== Dioceses and bishops ==
Dioceses and parishes of the Finnish Orthodox Church

=== Diocese of Helsinki ===
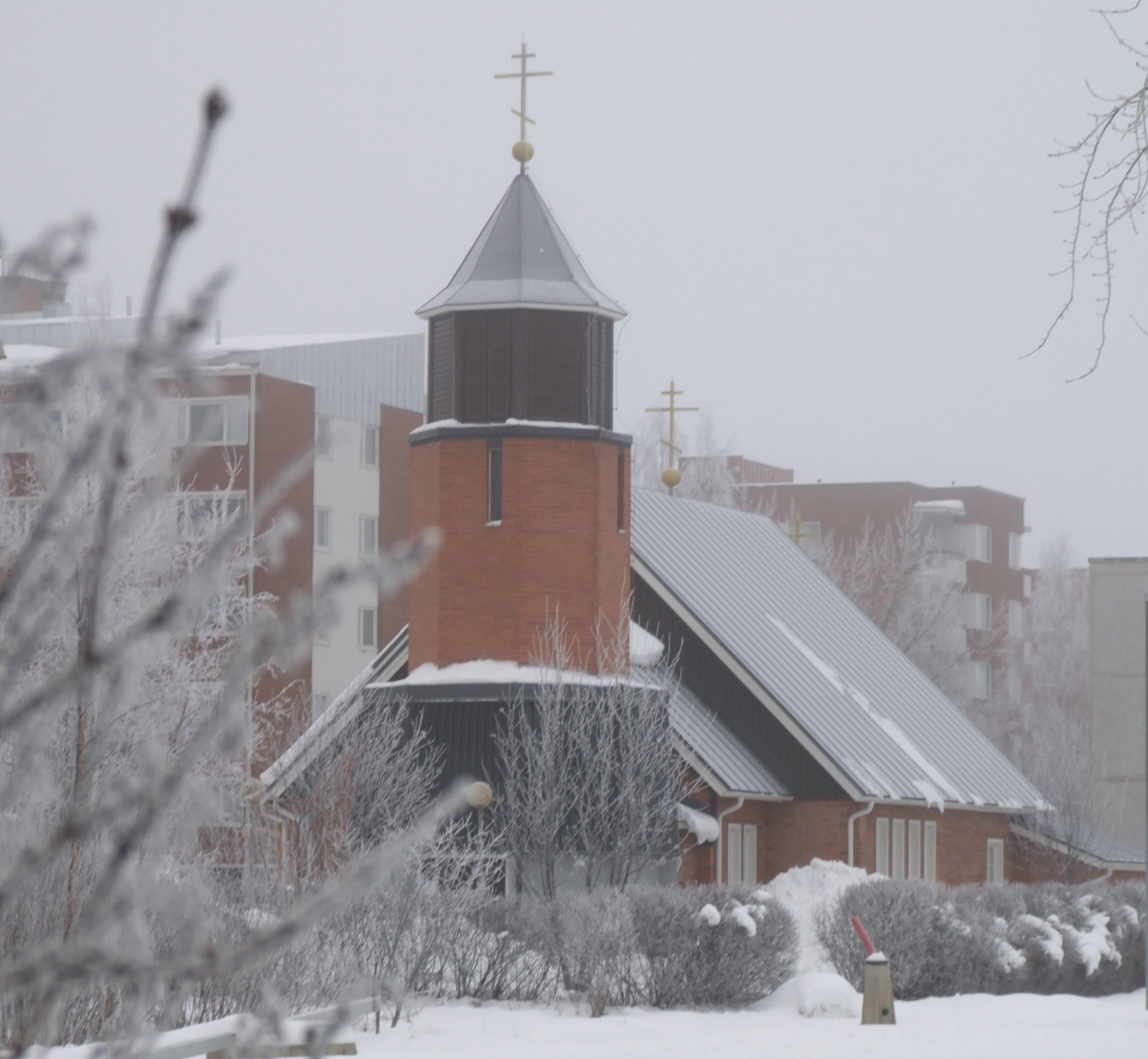
Holy Trinity Cathedral in Oulu, completed in 1957

The Diocese of Helsinki has the most members, over 28,000. The Diocese of Helsinki is the seat of the archbishop. The diocese is divided into three parishes, with 50 priests. The main church of the diocese is Uspenski Cathedral in Helsinki. Characteristic to the diocese is the large number of members who have recently immigrated to Finland, especially in the Helsinki parish where several churches also officiate at the service in foreign languages, including Russian, English, Greek and Romanian.

The current bishop is Archbishop Elia (Wallgren). He was appointed in 2024.

=== Diocese of Kuopio and Karelia ===
The seat of the Bishop of Kuopio and Karelia is in Kuopio.

The Diocese of Karelia has 19,000 church members in 5 parishes. The number of priests in the diocese is about 45, and churches and chapels total over 80. The diocese also includes the only Orthodox monasteries in Finland.

The Orthodox Church Museum of Finland also operates in Kuopio.

The current bishop is Metropolitan Arseni (Heikkinen). He was appointed in 2018.

=== Diocese of Oulu ===
The small Diocese of Oulu has four parishes, the largest of which is Oulu.

The diocese was established in 1980 and it has 6,000 members. The cathedral of the diocese is the Holy Trinity Cathedral of Oulu. Traditionally, the Skolts, now a small minority of only 300 speakers, have been the earliest Orthodox Christians in the Finnish Lapland. Today, they live predominantly in the Inari parish.

The Diocese of Oulu was founded as part of Archbishop Paul (Olmari)´s plan to make the Finnish Orthodox Church autocephalous. However, the autocephaly plan has now been abandoned.

The Locum Tenens after Metropolitan Elia`s election as Archbishop is Bishop Sergei (Rajapolvi).

== Monasteries ==
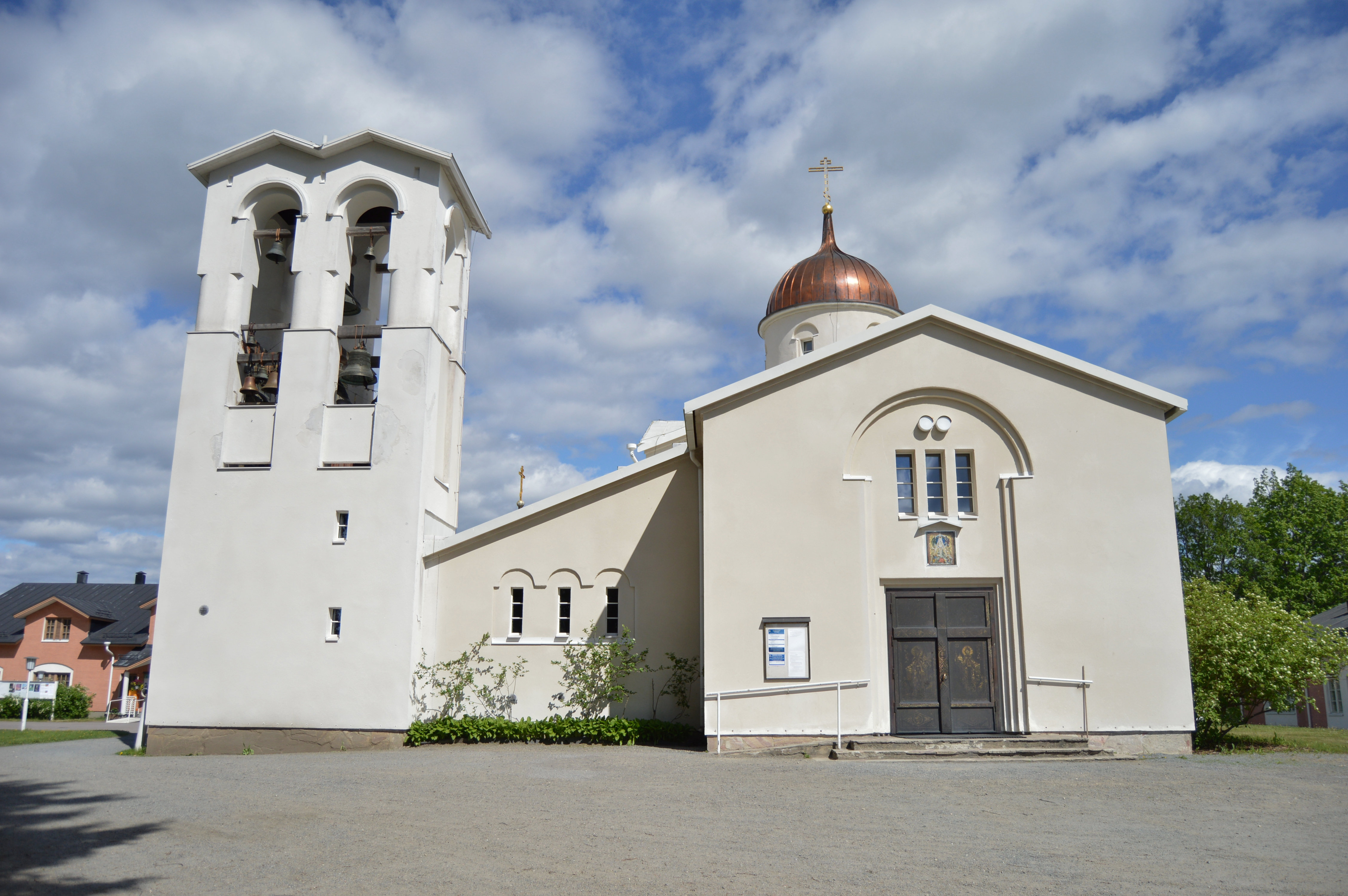
The New Valamo monastery main church

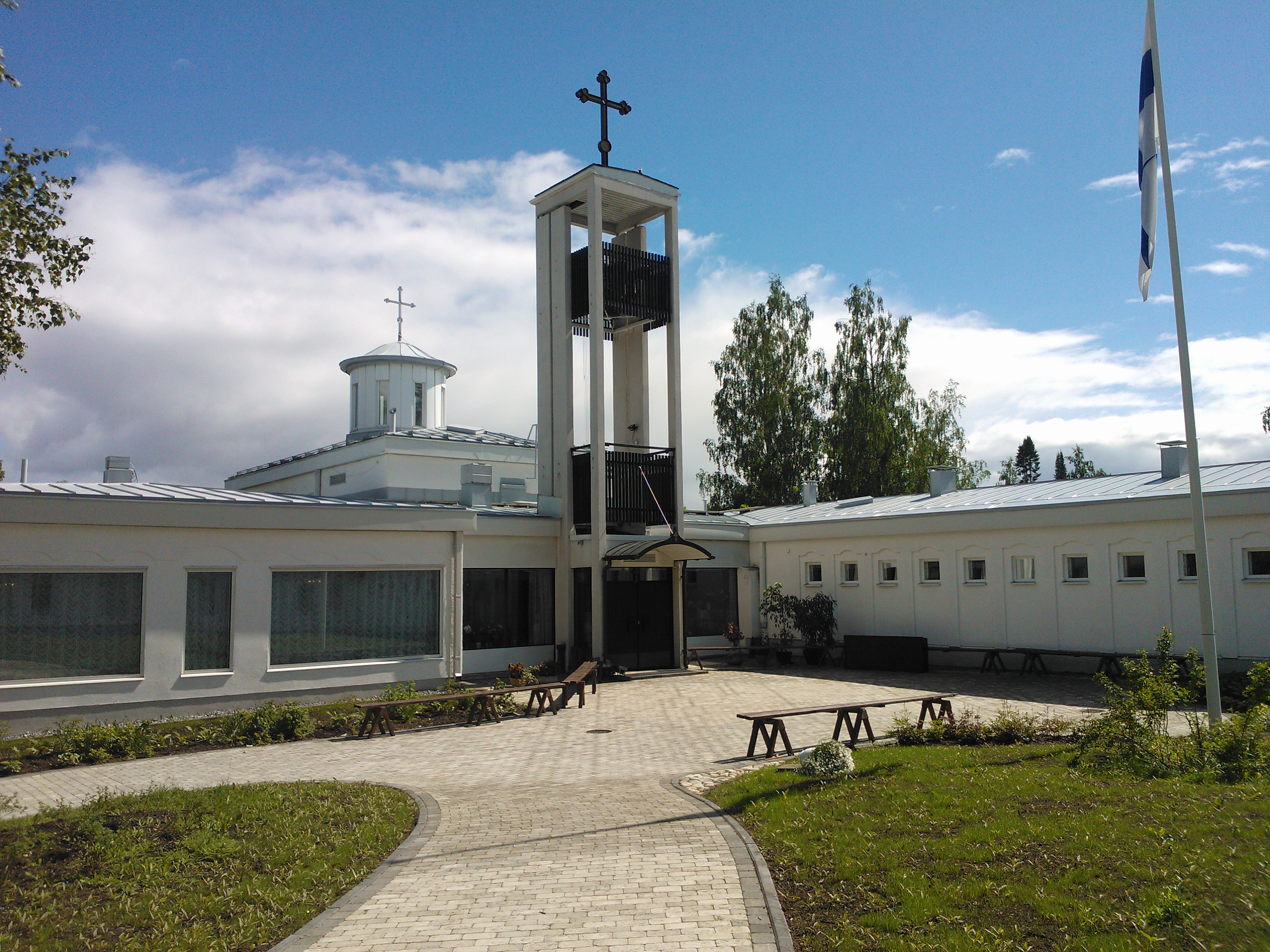
The Lintula Holy Trinity Convent main church

The only Orthodox Christian monastery in Finland, New Valamo (Valamon luostari), is situated in Heinävesi. The only Orthodox Christian convent Lintula Holy Trinity Convent (Lintulan Pyhän Kolminaisuuden luostari) is in Palokki, some 10 kilometers away from the monastery. Both were established during World War II when residents of the Karelian and Petsamo monasteries were evacuated from areas ceded to the Soviet Union. With friendly support from the Finnish Orthodox Church, a private Orthodox Brotherhood of Protection of the Mother of God (Pokrovan veljestö ry) has operated in Kirkkonummi since 2000, with two permanent members.

== Additional organizations ==
The following organizations operate within or on behalf of the Orthodox Church in Finland:

- Fellowship of St. Sergius and St. Herman (Pyhien Sergein ja Hermanin Veljeskunta)
- Orthodox Youth Association (Ortodoksisten nuorten liitto)
- Orthodox Student Association (Ortodoksinen opiskelijaliitto)
- Finnish Association of Orthodox Teachers (Suomen ortodoksisten opettajien liitto ry)
- Orthodox Priests' Association (Ortodoksisten pappien liitto)
- Orthodox Cantors' Association (Ortodoksisten kanttorien liitto)
- Finnish Society of Icon Painters (Suomen ikonimaalarit ry)
- Filantropia ry– Orthodox Church Aid and Foreign Mission society

=== Orthodox missions ===
The Finnish Orthodox Church established its own missionary organization in 1977 known as the Ortodoksinen Lähetys ry (Orthodox Missions). It has mainly been active in eastern Africa. It later merged with OrtAid and formed Filantropia.

== Feasts ==
The Finnish Orthodox Church is the only Orthodox church that, to comply with national legislation, celebrates Easter according to the Gregorian calendar. (Formerly, also the autonomous Estonian church followed this calendar.) Easter is the greatest feast of church year as it is with other Orthodox churches. Also the Twelve Great Feasts are observed. Other highly observed feasts are:

- Circumcision of Christ and St. Basil the Great, 1 January
- Holy Martyr and Confessor John of Sonkajanranta, 8 March
- Saint John of Valaam, 5 June
- Saints Sergius and Herman of Valaam, 28 June
- Feast of Saints Peter and Paul, 29 June
- Intercession of the Theotokos, 1 October
- Holy Enlighteners of Karelia, Saturday between 31 October – 6 November
- Saint Nicholas the Wonderworker, 6 December, which is celebrated as same day as Independence Day of Finland
- Nativity of Christ, 25 December

== Church architecture ==
Many Orthodox churches in Finland are small. The few more impressive shrines were built in the 19th century, when Finland was an autonomous Grand Duchy in the Russian Empire, with the Orthodox Christian Emperor as the Grand Duke of Finland. Notable churches in Helsinki from that era are the Uspenski Cathedral (1864) and the Holy Trinity church (1826). The oldest Orthodox church in Finland is the church of Protection of the Theotokos in Lappeenranta from 1782 to 1785.

The Orthodox Church of St. Peter and St. Paul in Hamina was completed in 1837. Built in the architectural style of Neoclassicism with some Byzantine-style elements, the exterior was designed in the form of a round-domed temple, while the interior is cruciform. The belfry was built in 1862 in the Neo-Byzantine style. The Orthodox church of Tampere was built in Russian romantic style, with onion style cupolas, and was ready in 1896. The architect of the Russian army, T.U. Jasikov, drew the floor plan. The church was consecrated in 1899 to Saint Alexander Nevsky, a Novgorodian who in 1240 fought against the Catholic Swedes and two years later the Catholic Teutonic Knights with equal success. Emperor Nicholas II donated the bells to this church. The church suffered heavily during the Finnish Civil War in 1918; its reconstruction took many years. After Finland declared its independence, it was re-consecrated to St. Nicholas.

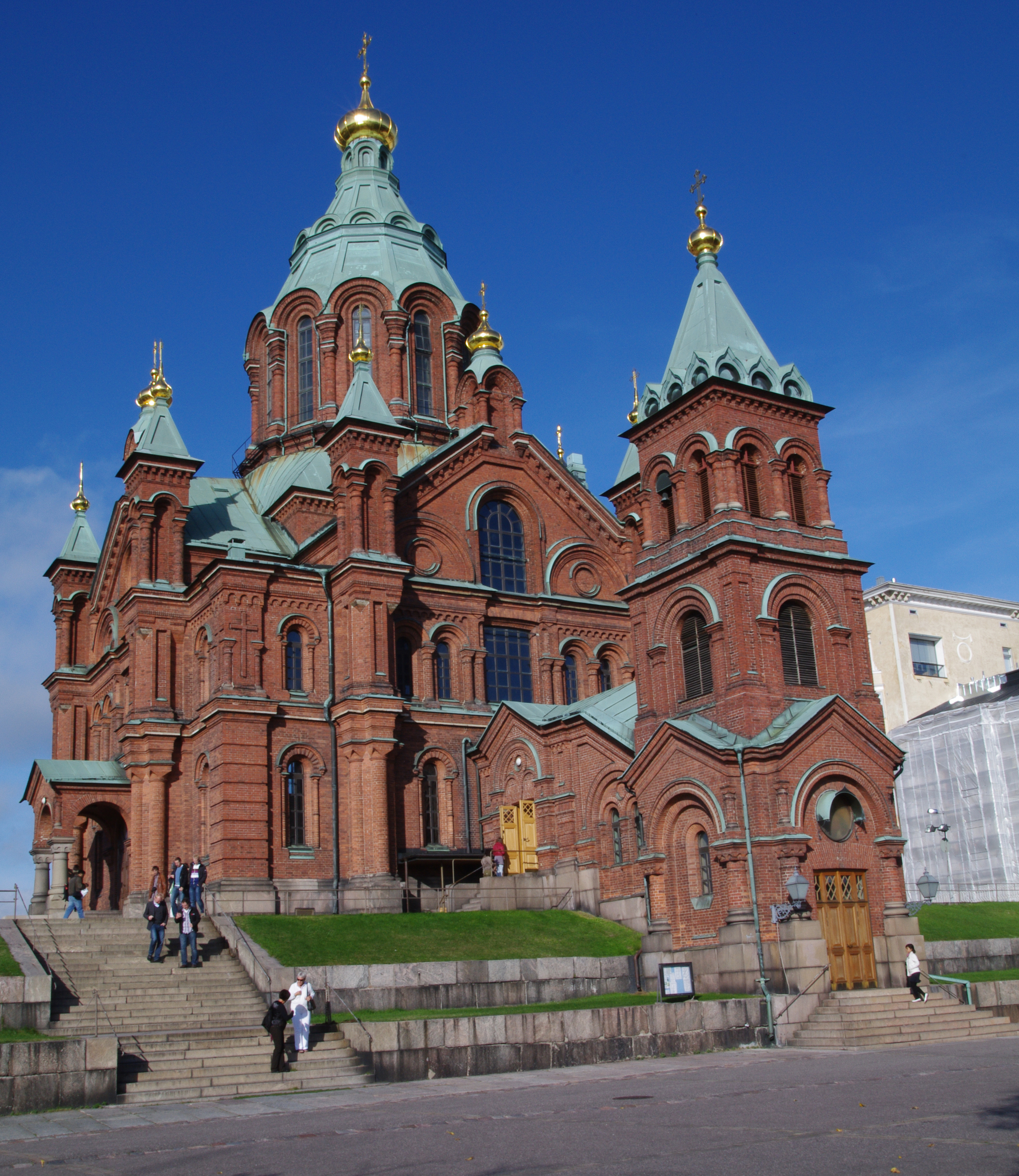
19th-century Cathedral of Dormition of Theotokos (Uspenski Cathedral) in Helsinki

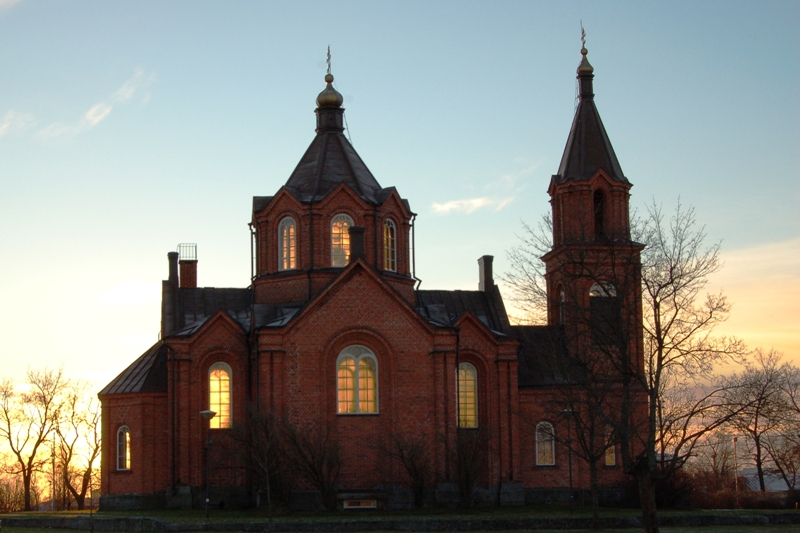
The St. Nicholas Church in Vaasa (1862)

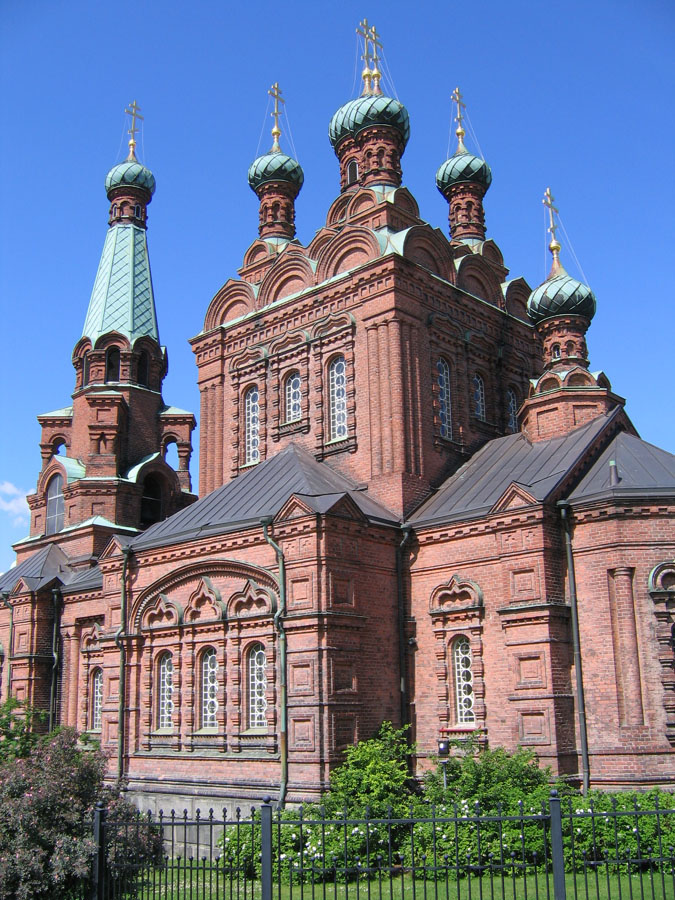
Church of Alexander Nevsky and Saint Nicholas in Tampere, built late 19th-century

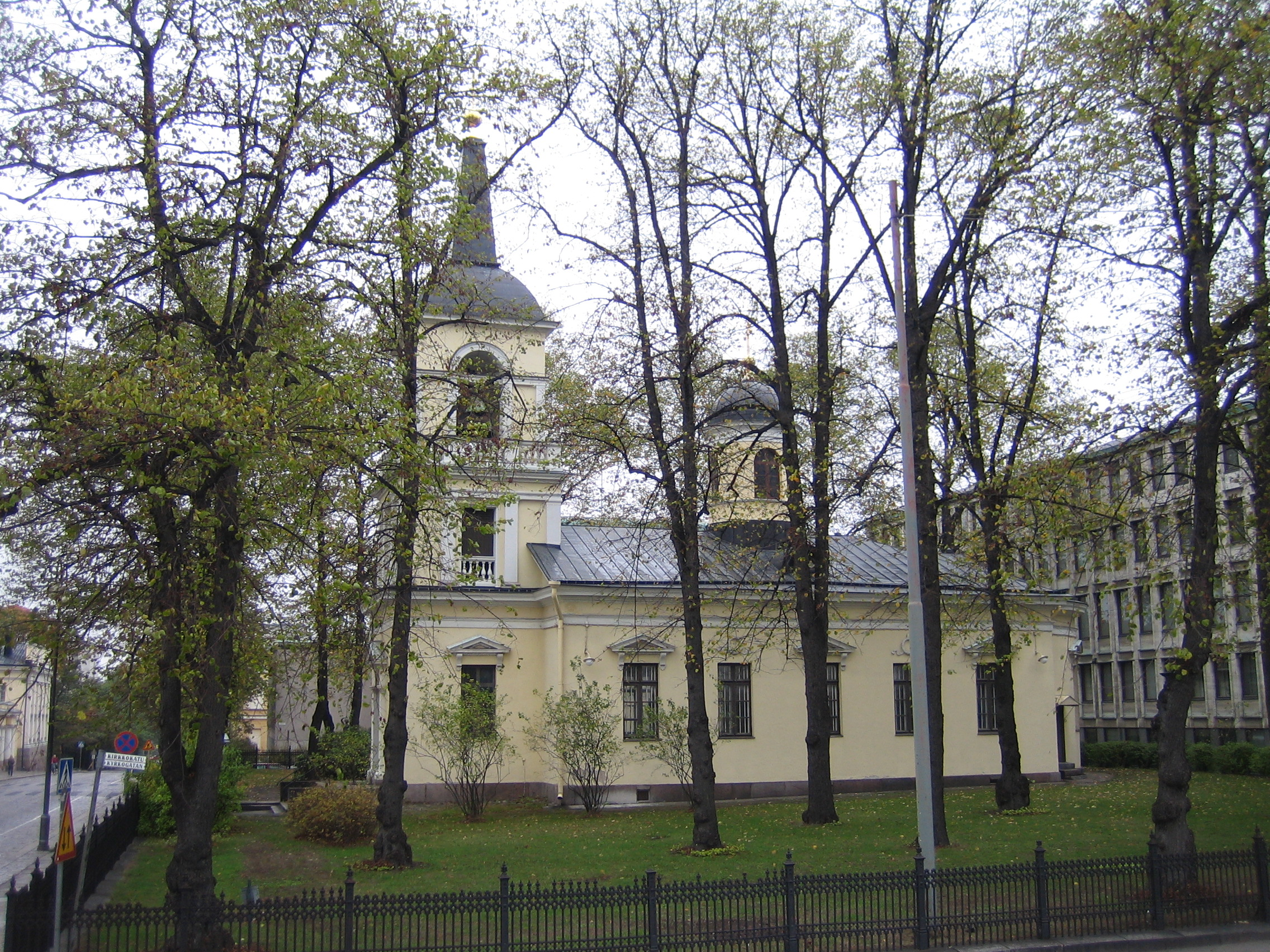
Holy Trinity church in Helsinki, built 1826

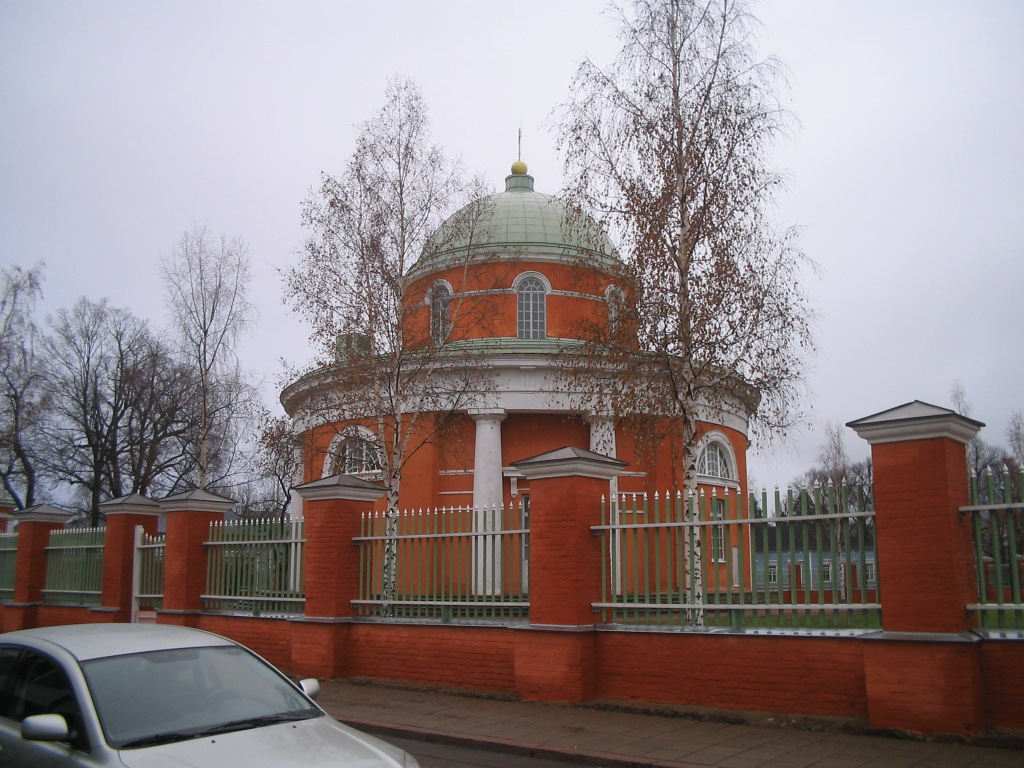
Church of Holy Apostles Peter and Paul in Hamina, built 1837

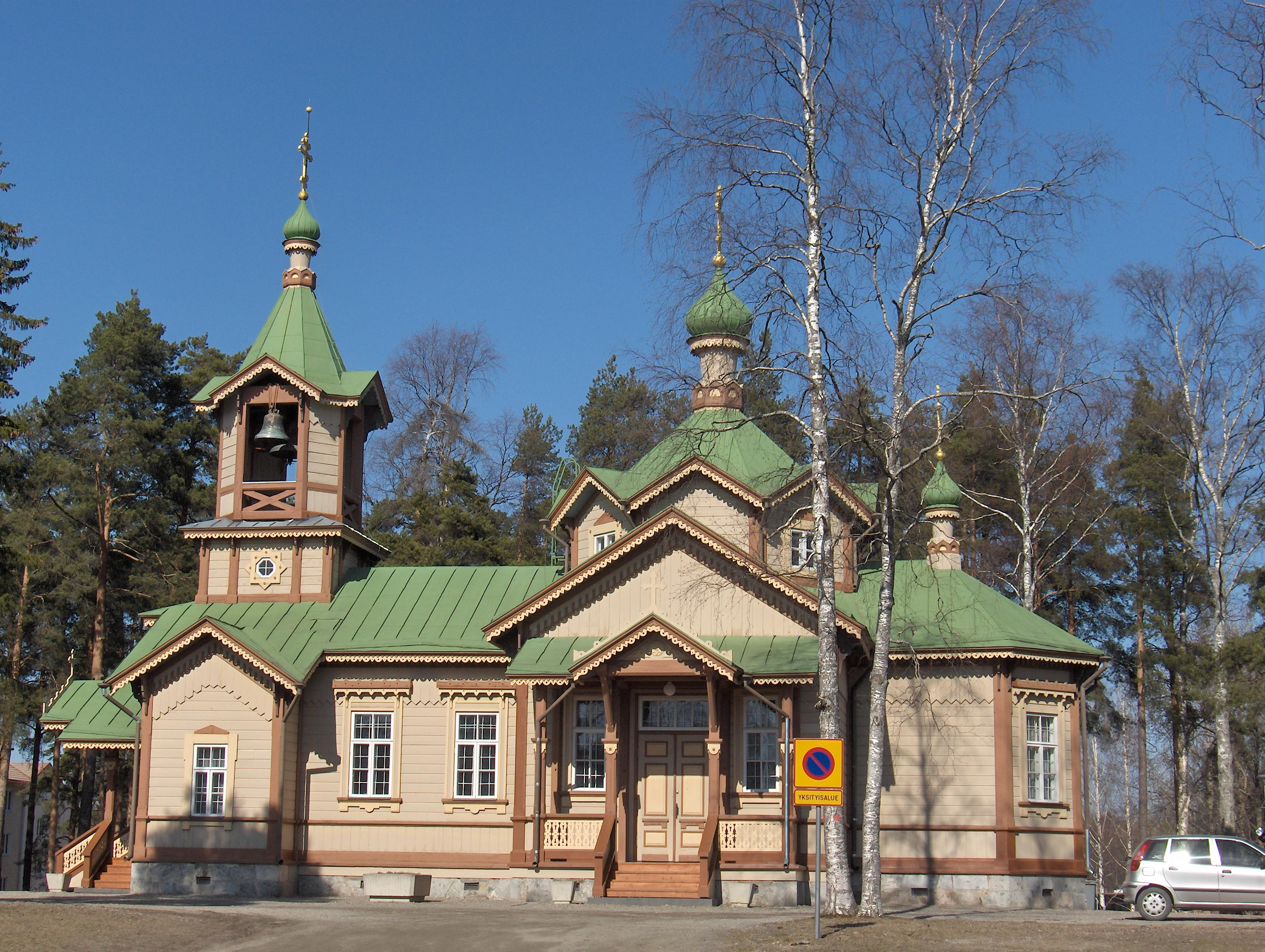
St. Nicholas Church in Joensuu (1887), perhaps the most notable wooden Orthodox church in Finland

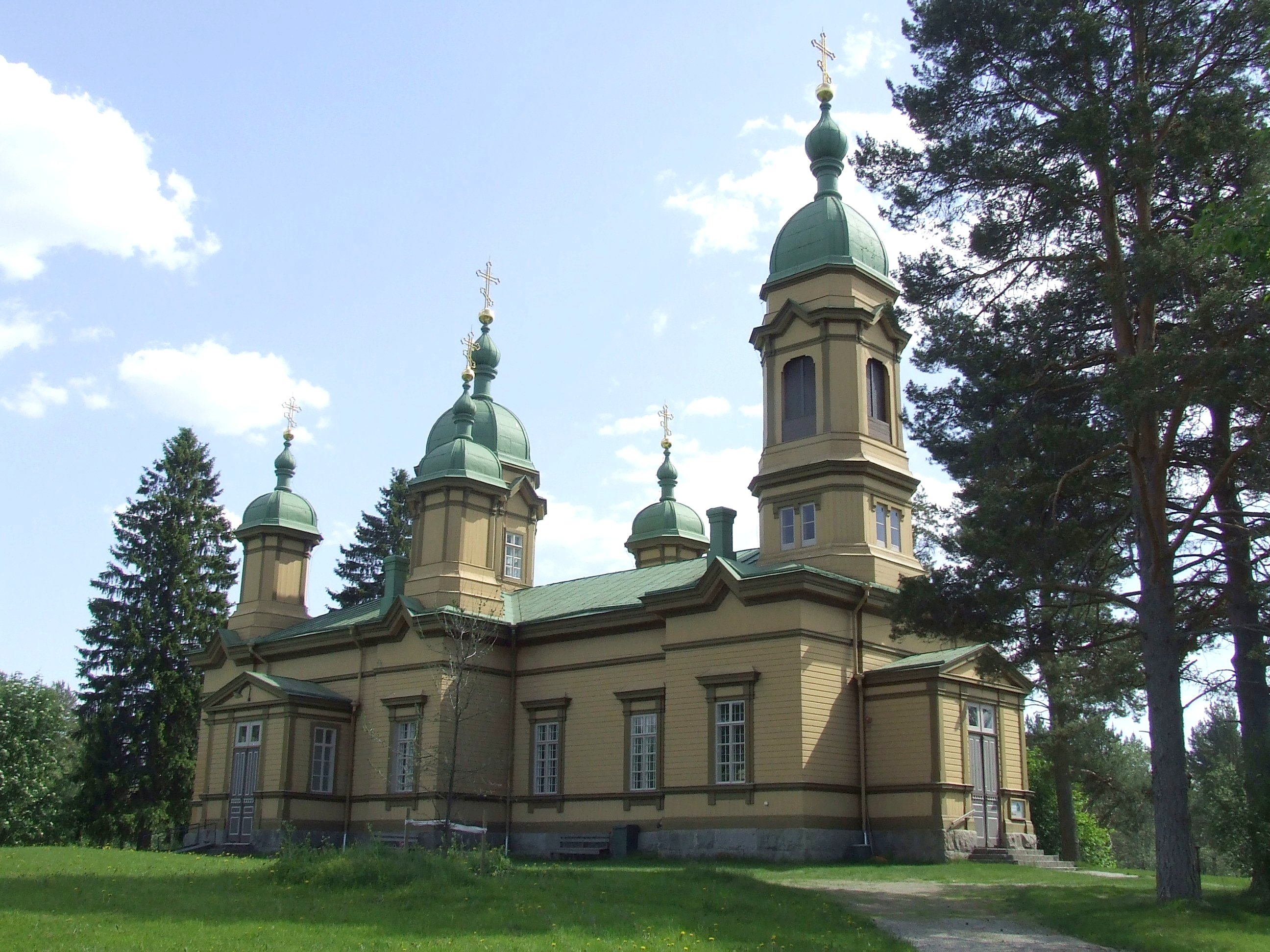
Church of Prophet Elijah in Ilomantsi, built in 1892

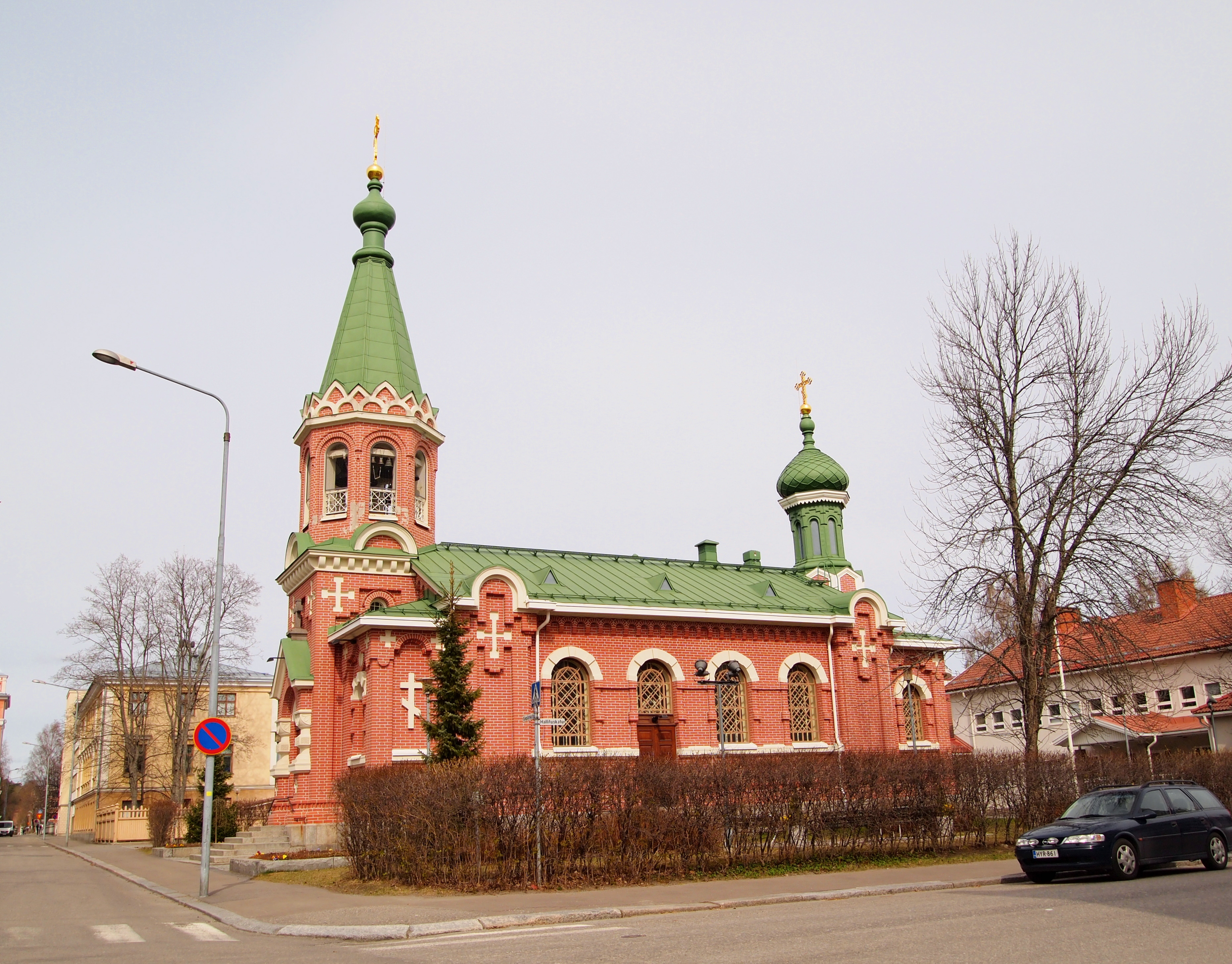
Cathedral of St. Nicholas the Wonderworker in Kuopio, built in 1904

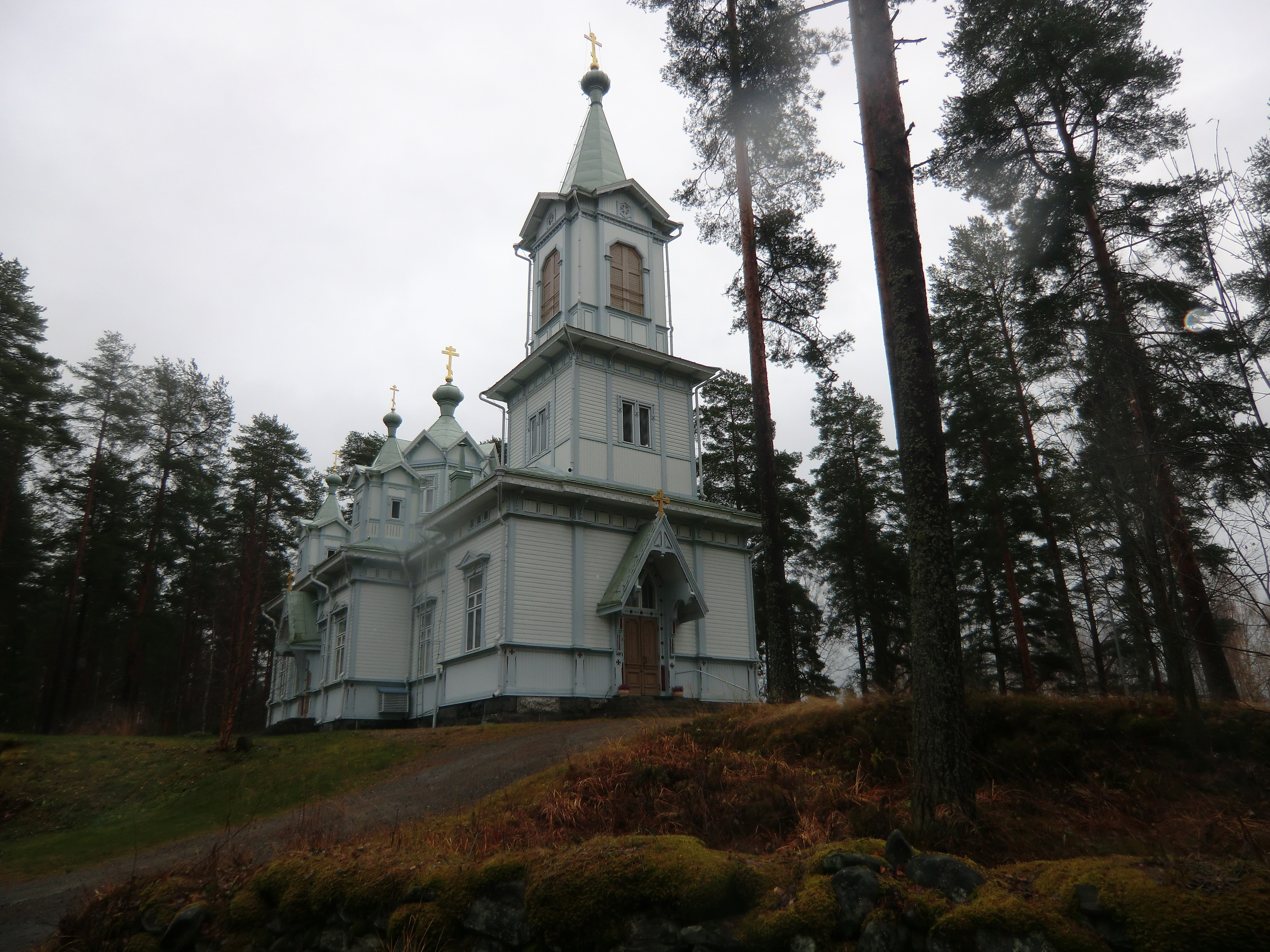
Church of Our Lady of Tikhvin in Viinijärvi, Liperi built in 1906

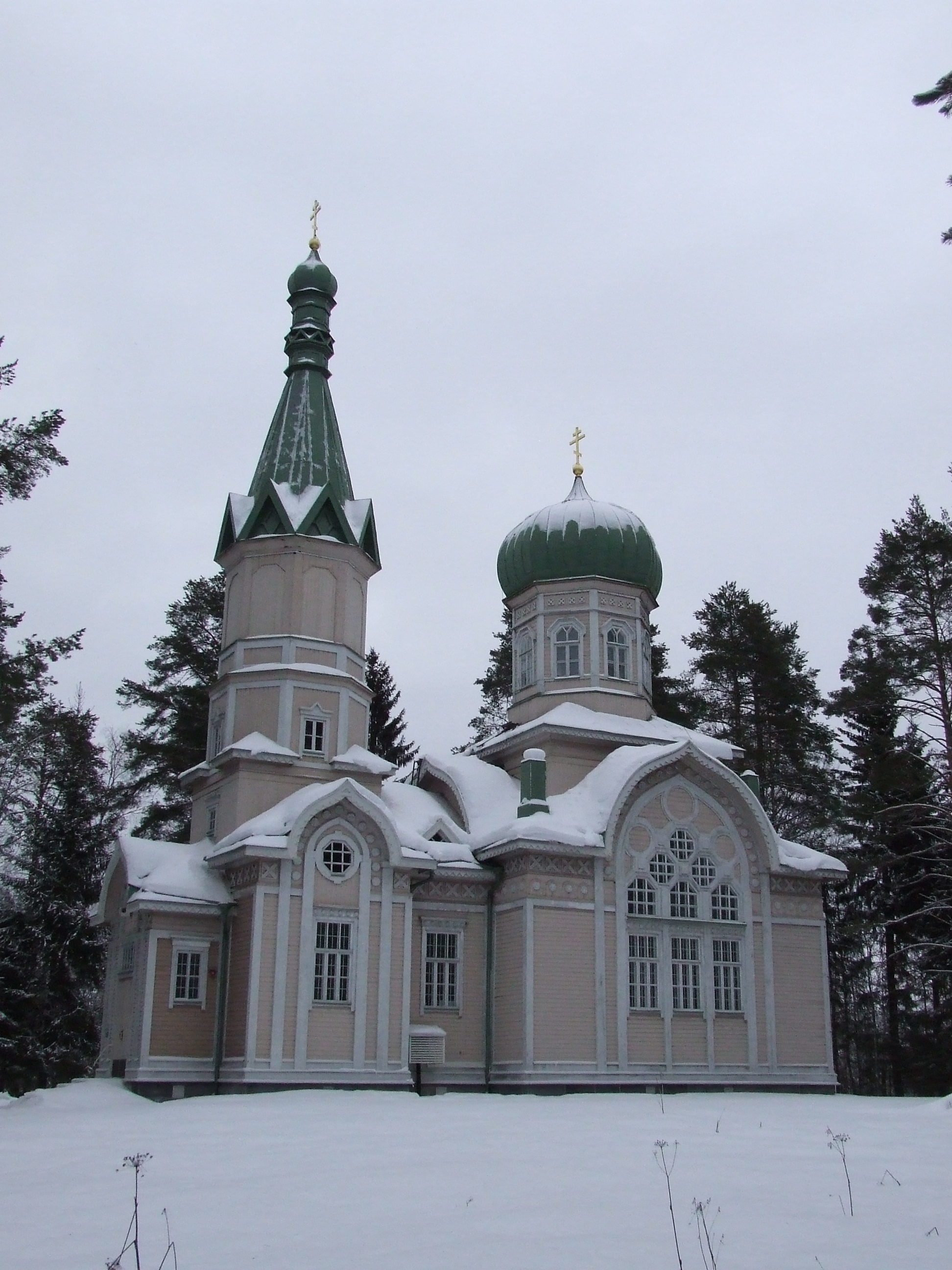
Church of St. John the Baptist in Polvijärvi, built in 1914

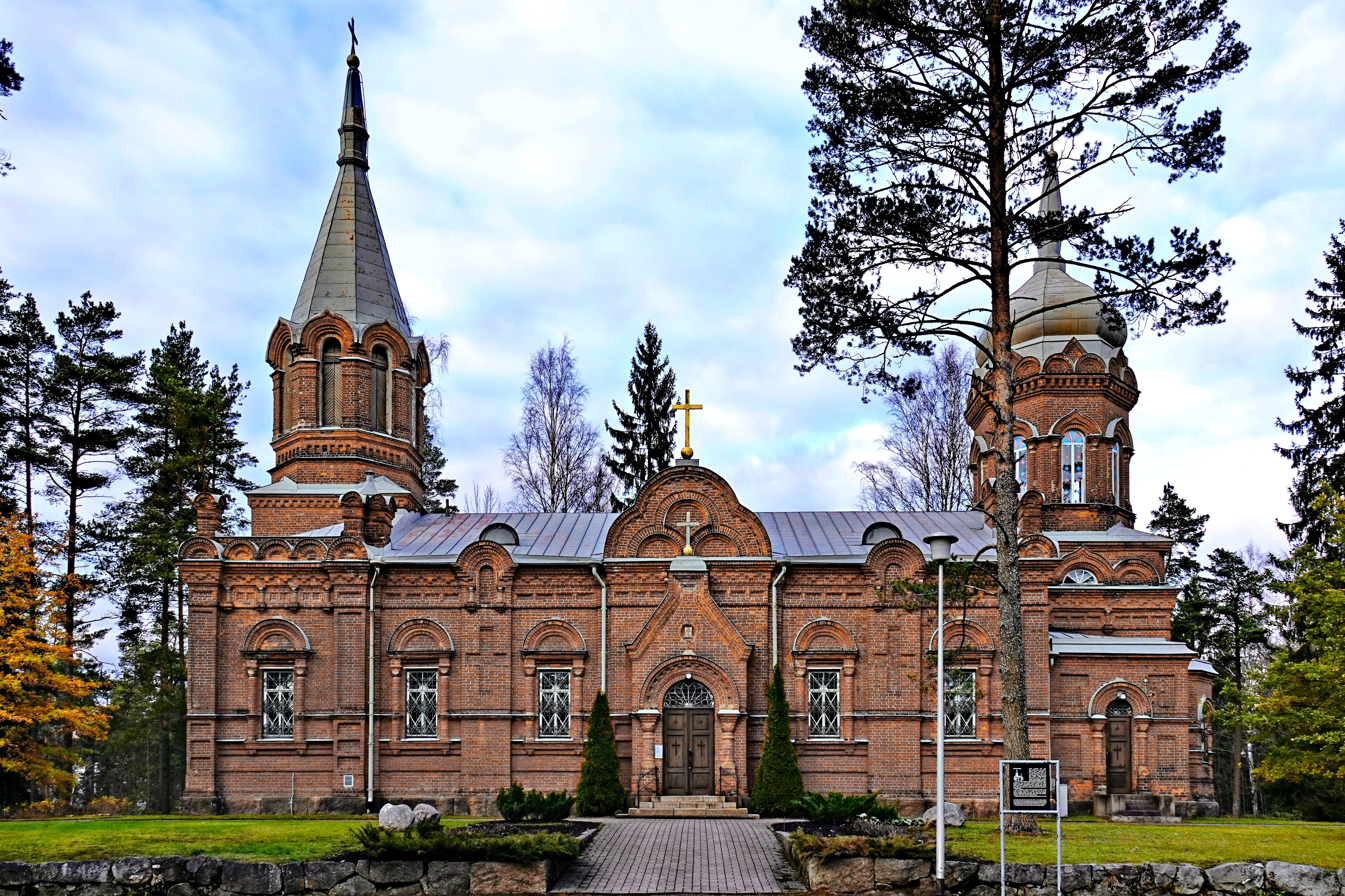
Church of the Holy Cross in Kouvola, built 1915

=== After Second World War ===
After the Second World War, Finland had to cede land to the Soviet Union under Paris Peace Treaties. Almost all Orthodox churches and chapels remained on the Soviet side in Karelia and Petsamo. The Finnish state enacted a special reconstruction law, in which it financed the construction of 14 churches and 44 chapels for the Orthodox church. The churches and chapels were modern in architecture, lacking domes and other features typical to the Orthodox church architecture. This was mandated by the Finnish state which strictly selected the architects. Most reconstruction era churches and chapels are designed by Ilmari Ahonen and Toivo Paatela.

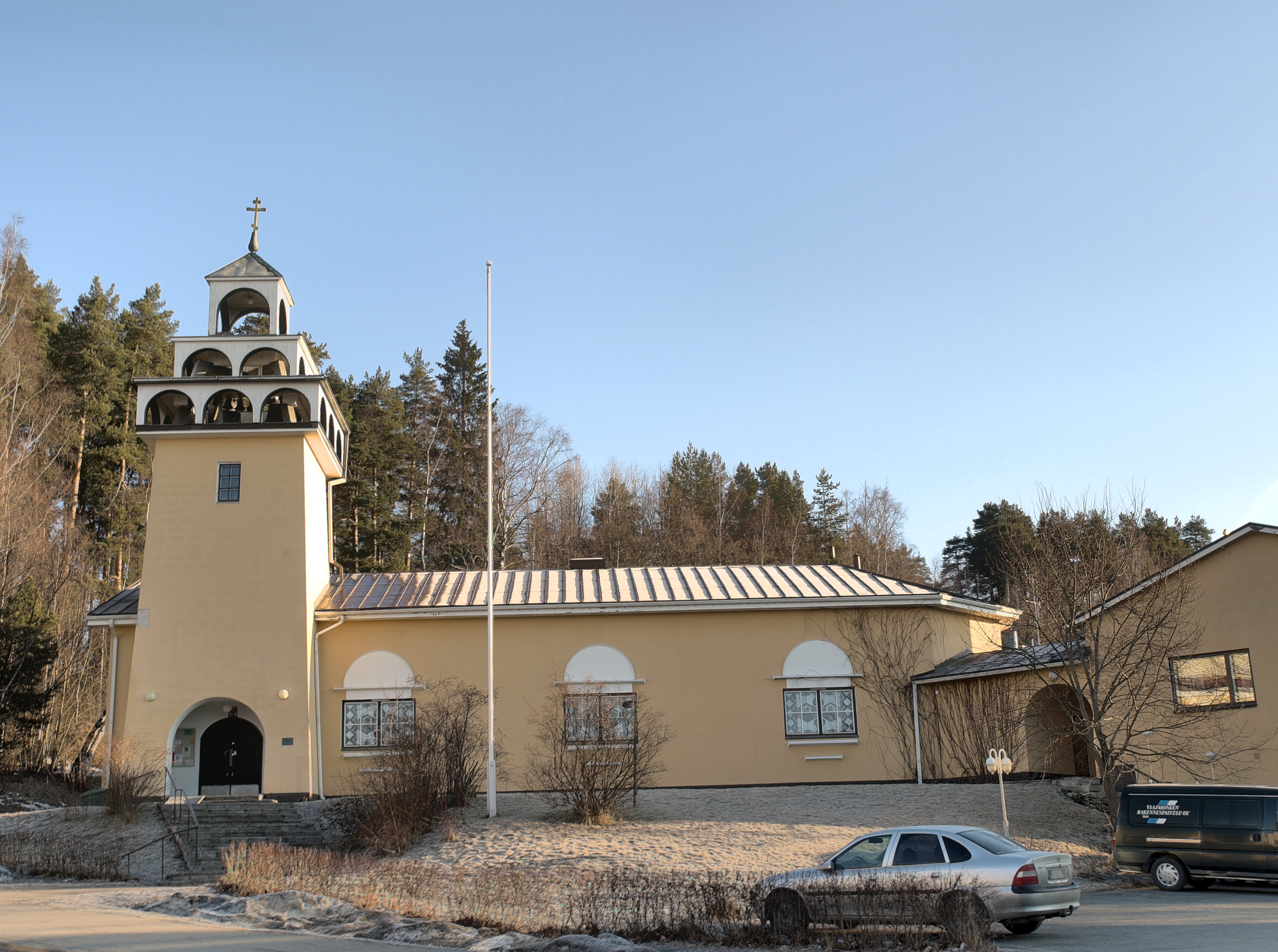
Church of Resurrection of Christ, Jyväskylä, built in 1954 and designed by Toivo Paatela

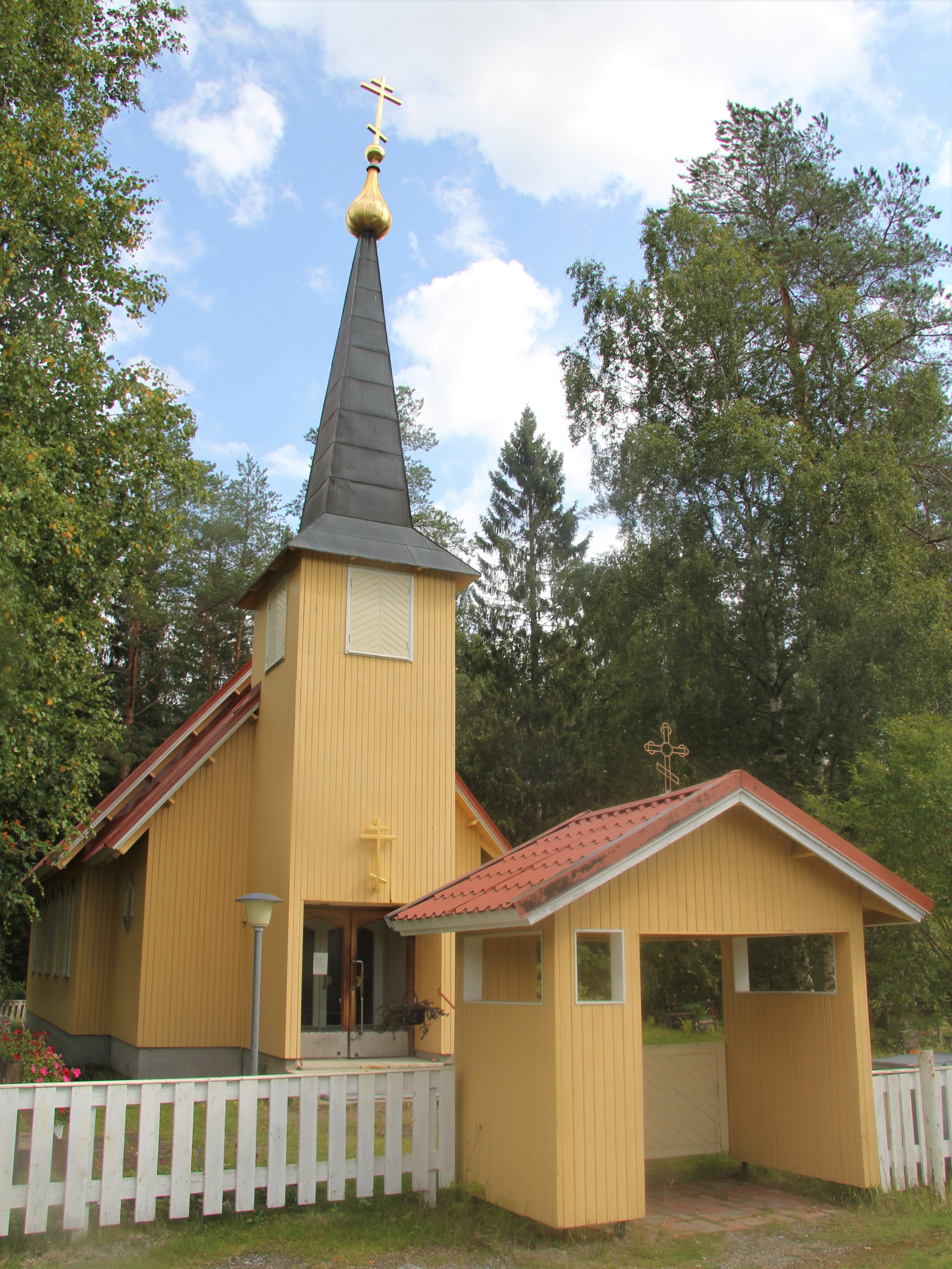
Chapel of Sts. Peter and Paul, Sukeva, Sonkajärvi, built in 1960 and designed by Ilmari Ahonen

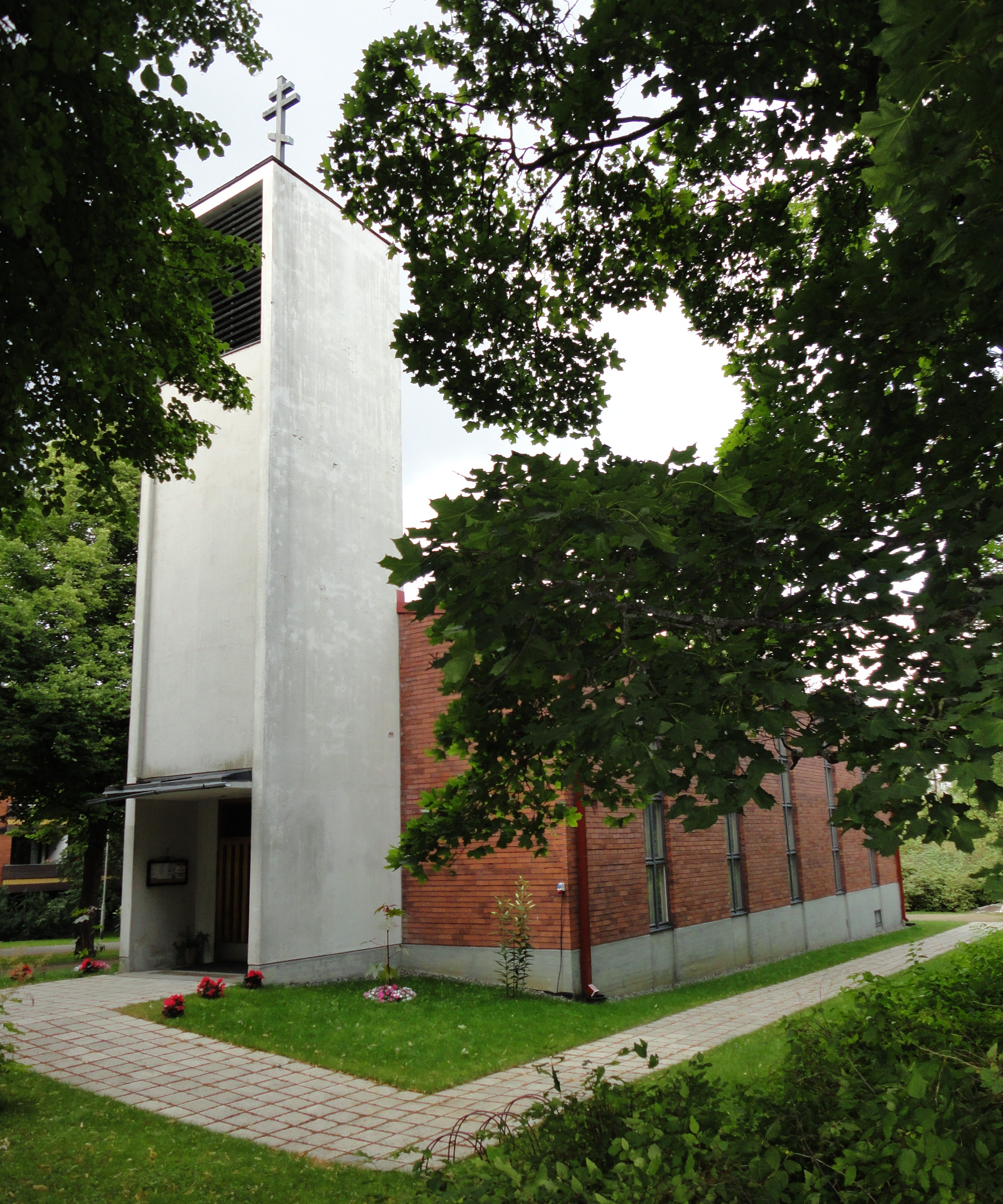
Church of sts. Aleksander Nevsky and John Chrysostom in Hämeenlinna, built in 1962 and designed by Mika Erno

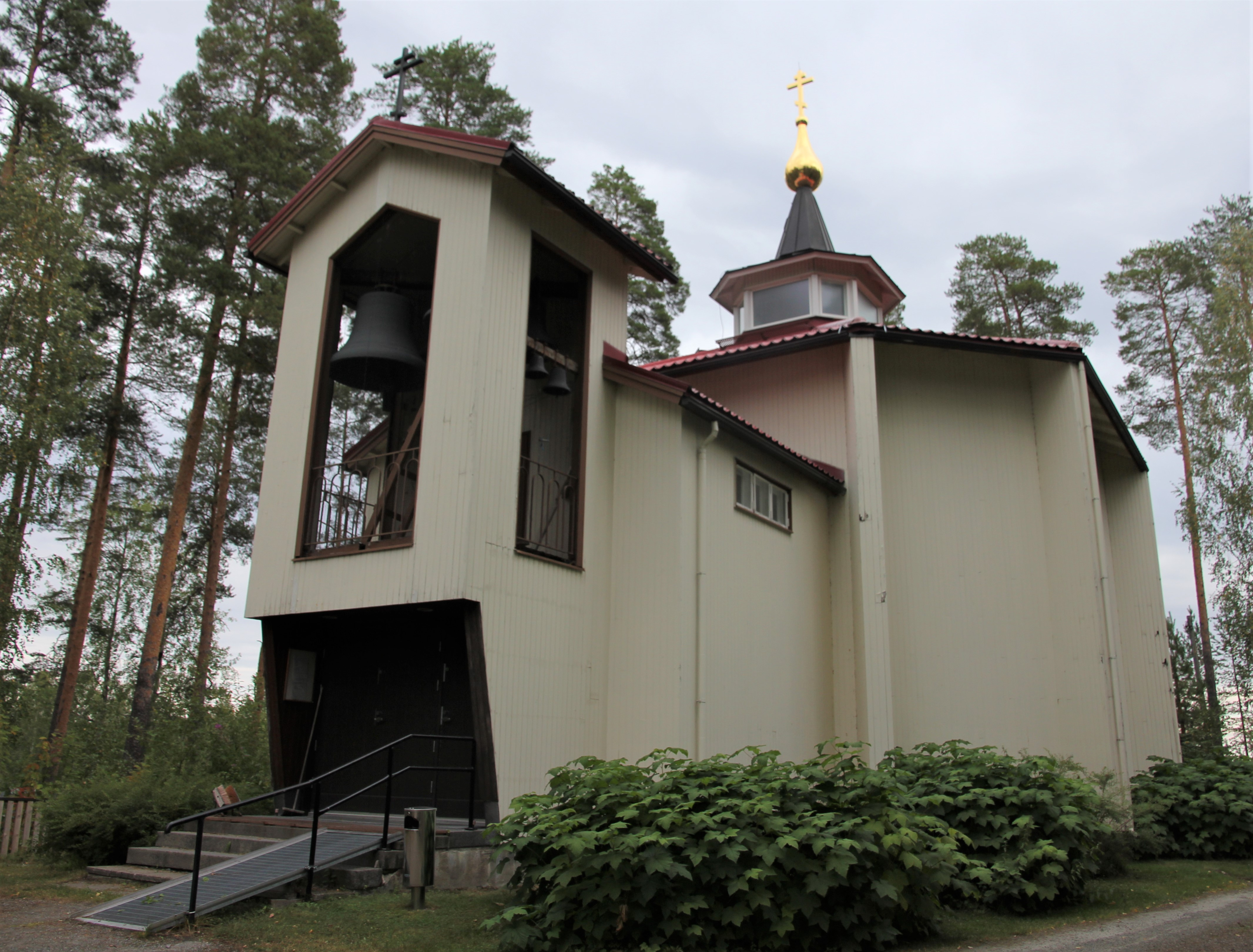
Church of St. Nicholas the Wonderworker in Rautalampi, built in 1960 and designed by Ilmari Ahonen

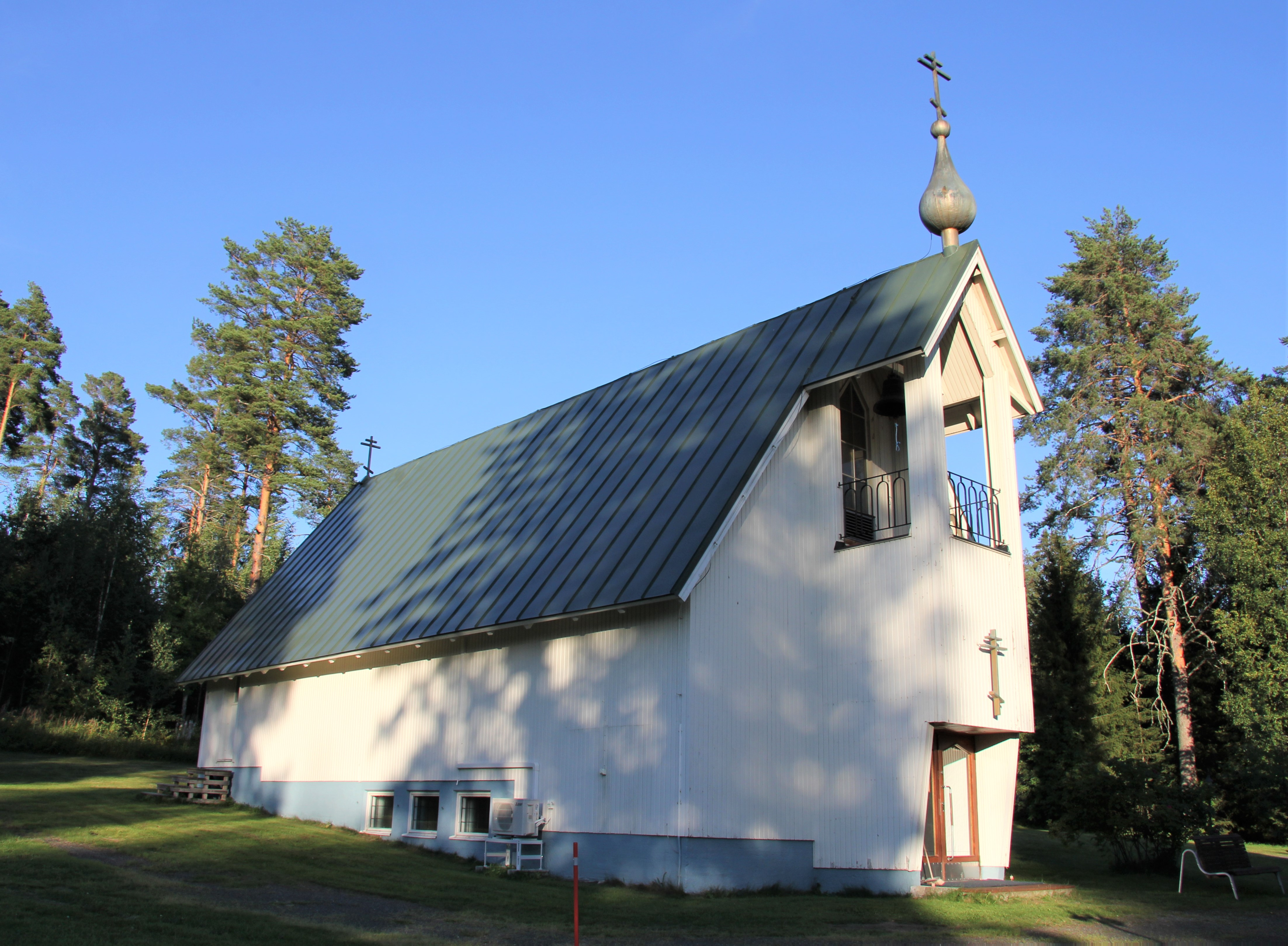
Church of Enlighteners of Karelia in Maaninka, Kuopio, built as a chapel 1960 and designed by Ilmari Ahonen, later consecrated as a church

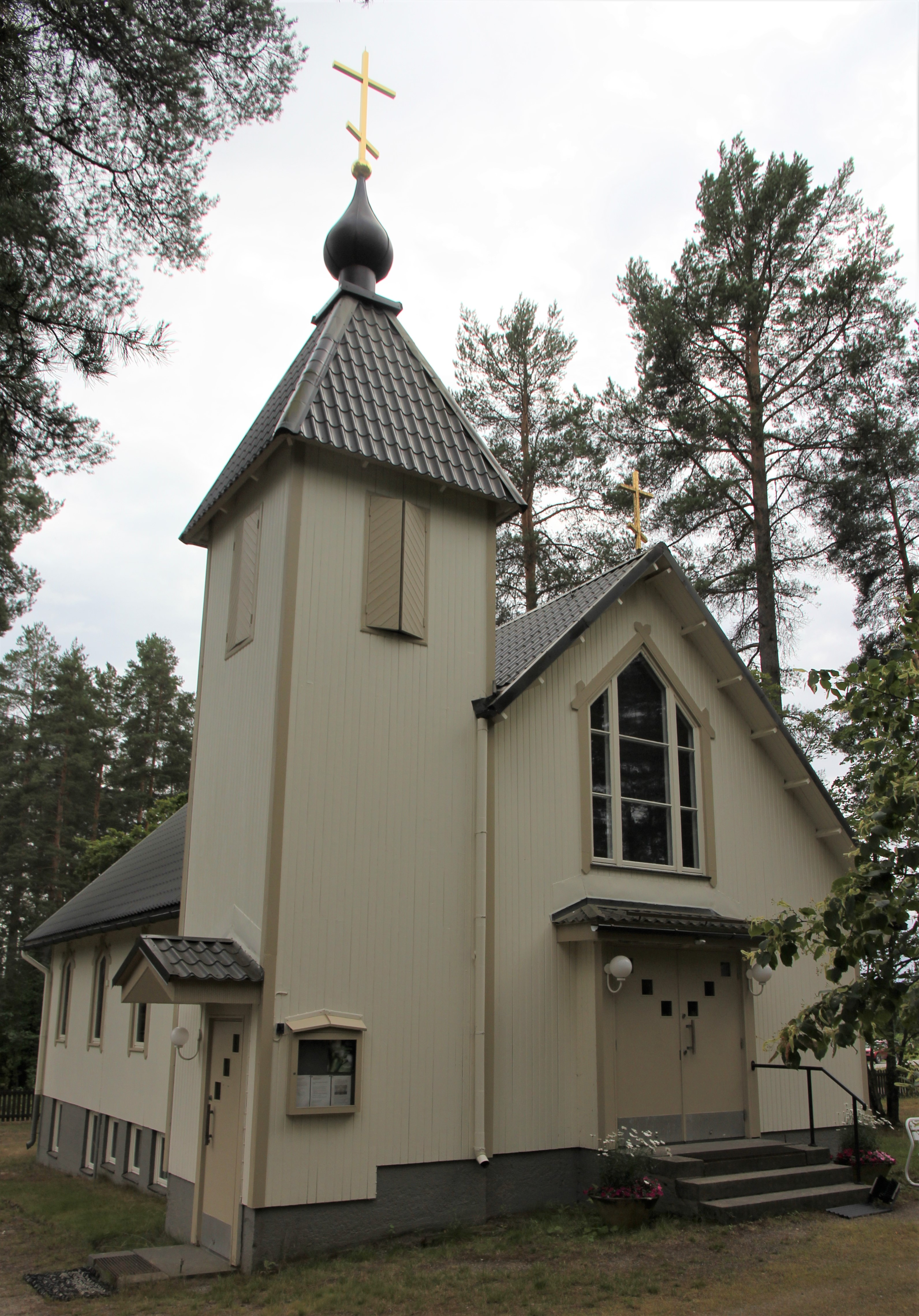
Church of Transfiguration of Christ in Suonenjoki, designed by Ilmari Ahonen, built as a chapel 1958 and designed by Ilmari Ahonen, later consecrated as a church

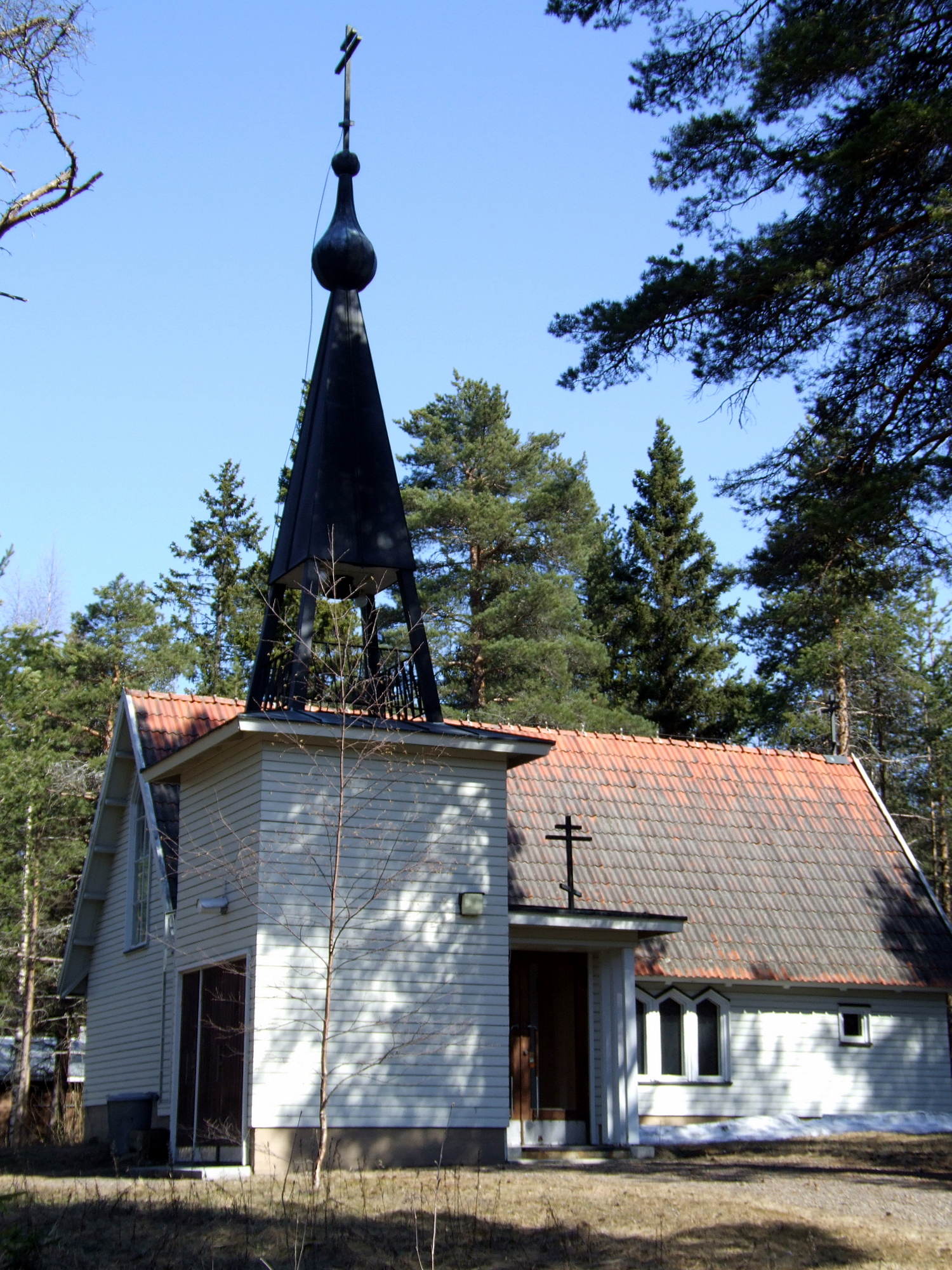
Chapel of Holy apostles Peter and Paul and St. Arseny of Konevsky in Haukipudas, Oulu, designed by Ilmari Ahonen, built in 1962 and demolished in 2019

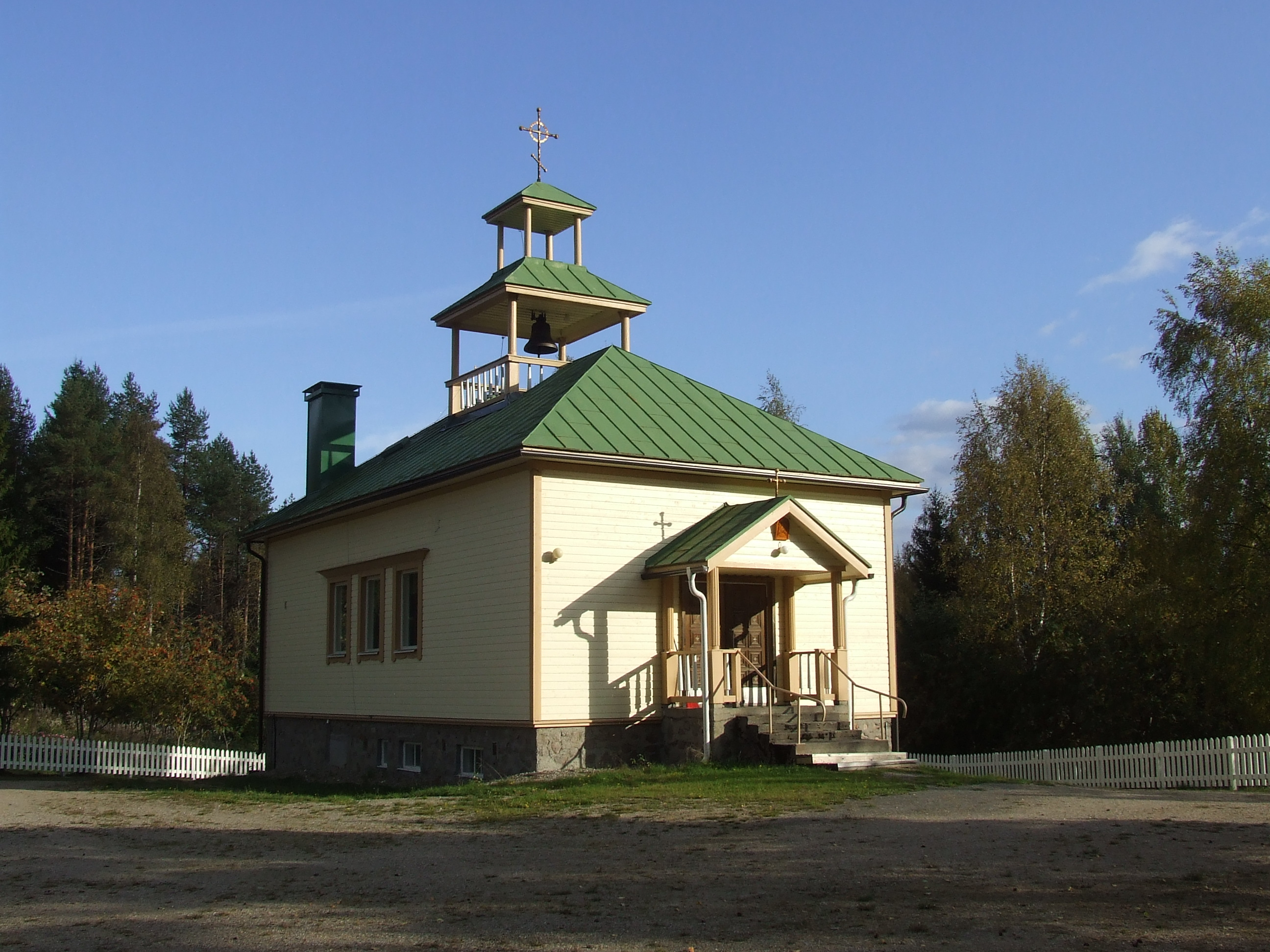
Church of St. Nicholas in Hoilola, Joensuu, built as a chapel in 1957 and consecrated as a church in 1993

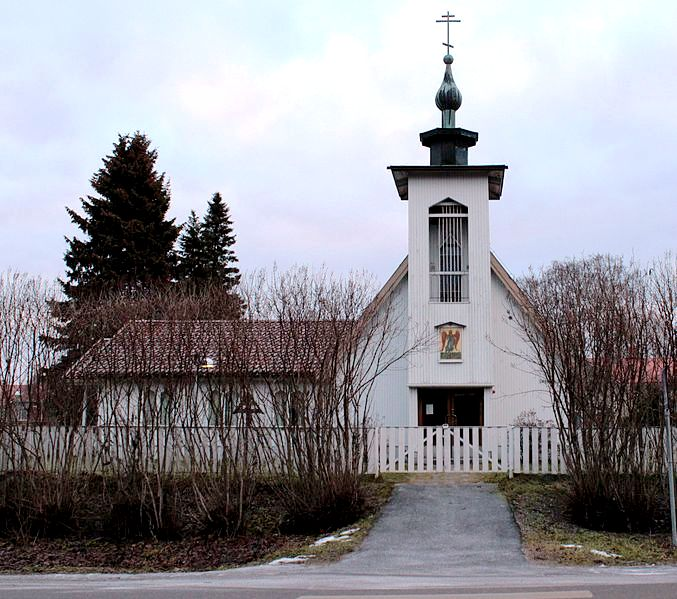
Church of St. John the Baptist in Kemi, designed by Ilmari Ahonen, built as a chapel 1962 and designed by Ilmari Ahonen, later consecrated as a church

From the 1970s to the 1990s, Karelian-type log churches and chapels were built were built in Finland with some modern exceptions.

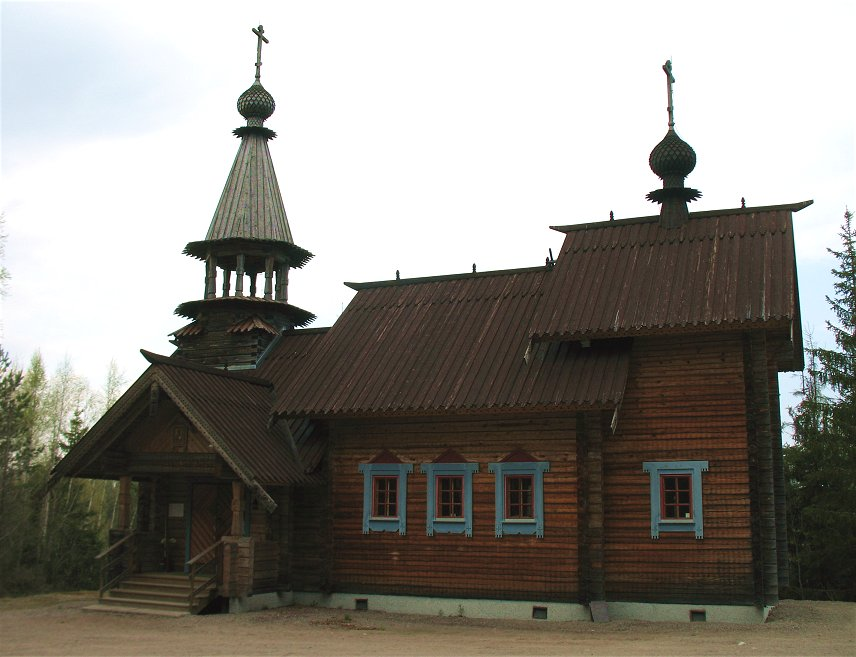
Church of St. Nektarios of Aegina, in Klaukkala, built in 1997 and designed by Ritva Westermark

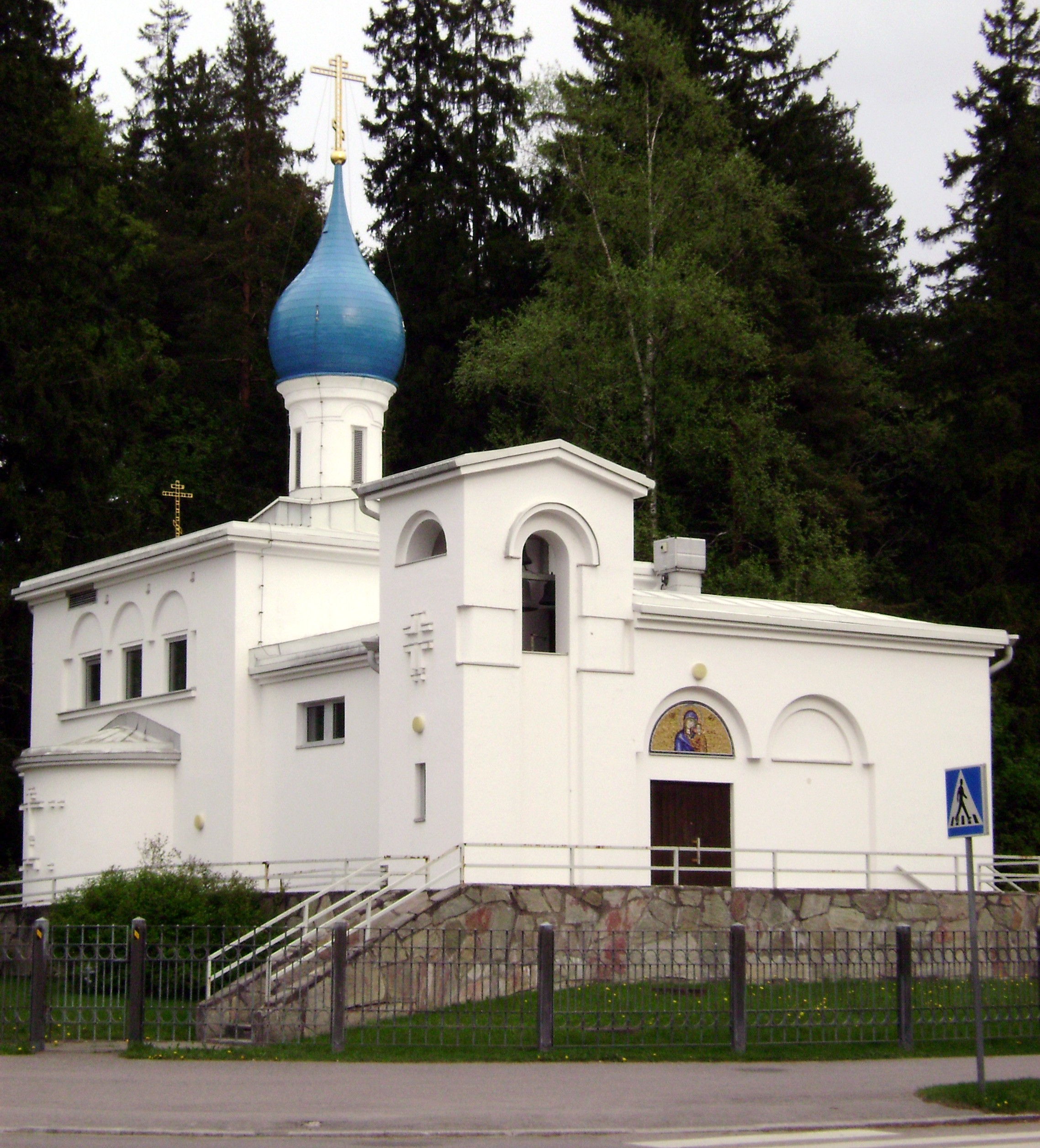
Church of Our Lady of Kazan in Järvenpää, built in 1980

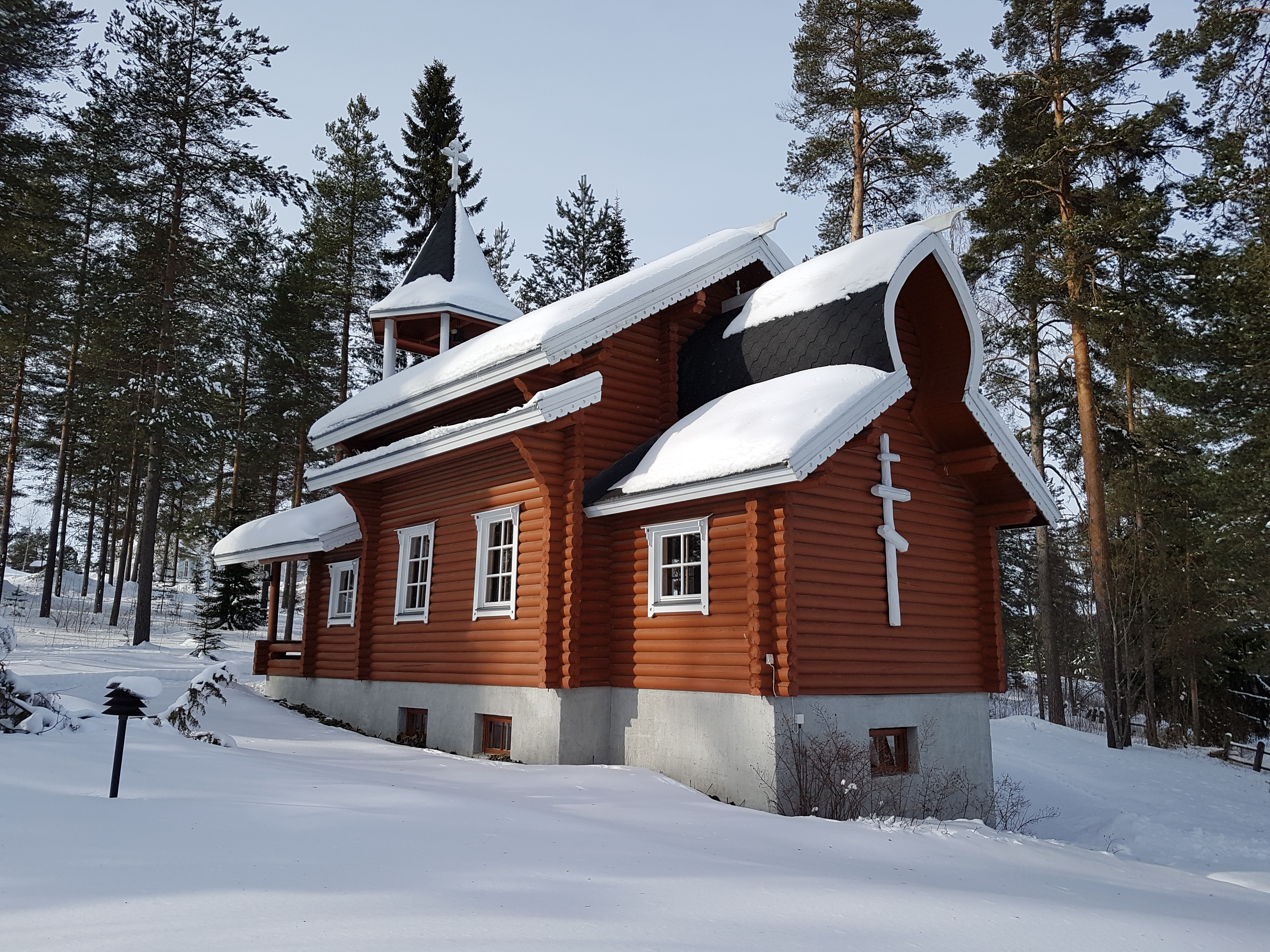
Chapel of Transfiguration of Christ in Viitasaari, built in 1989

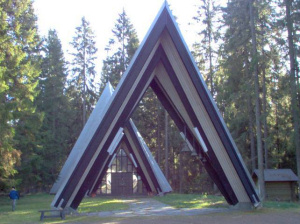
Chapel of St. Andrew the Apostle in Liperi, built in 1973, designed by Vilho Suonmaa

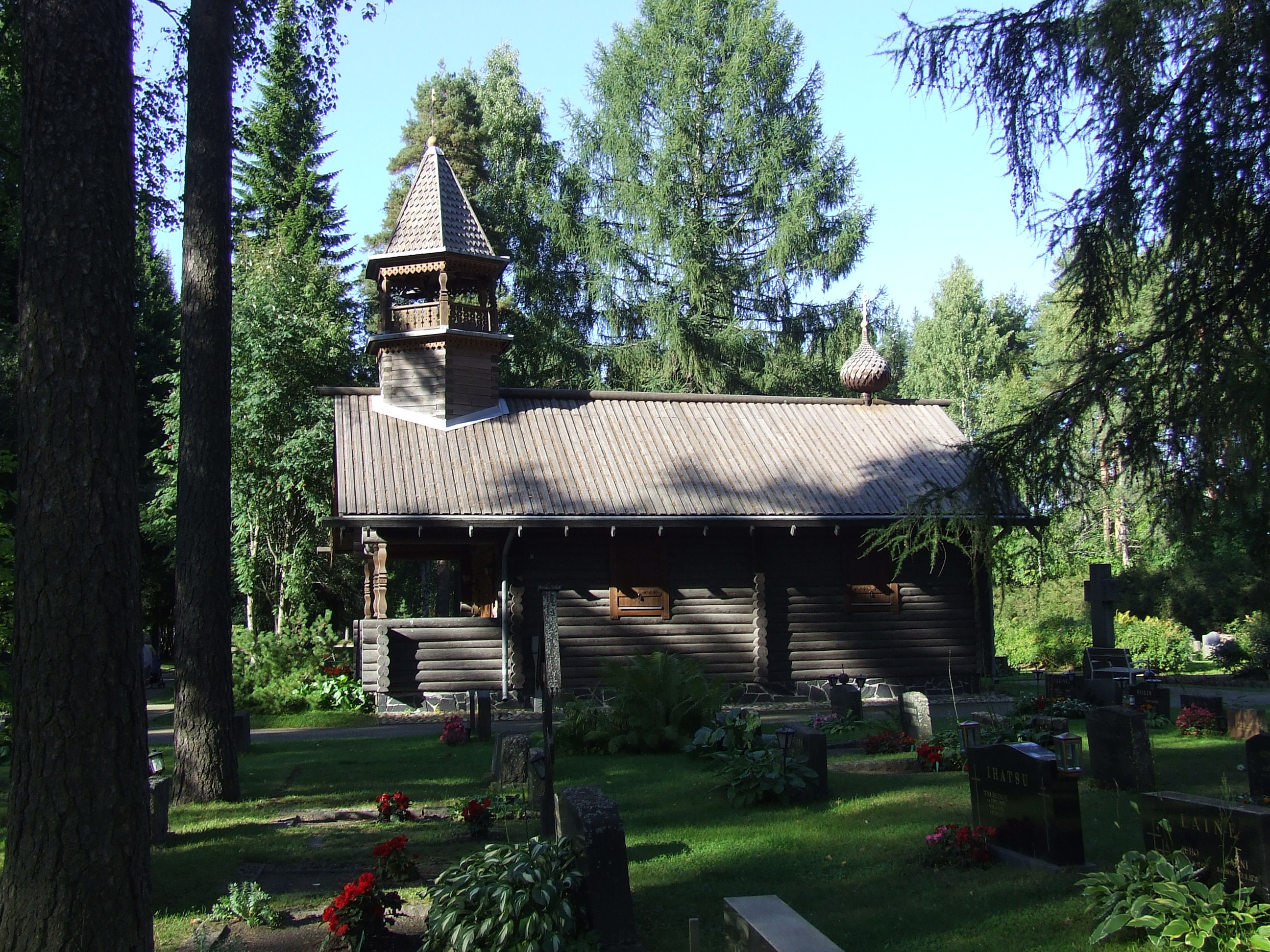
Chapel of the Holy Cross in Joensuu Orthodox cemetery, built 1986

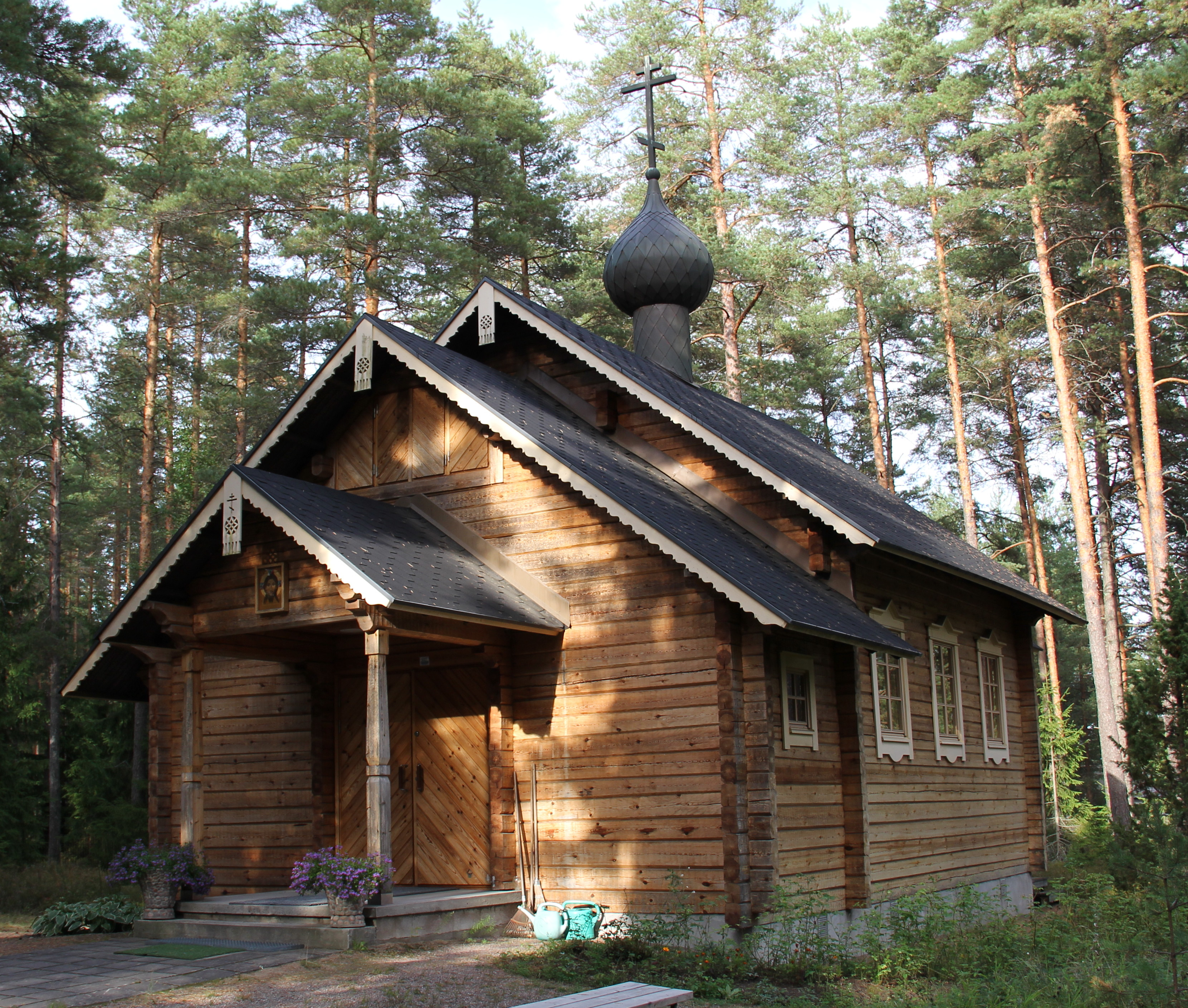
Chapel of All Saints in Lohja, built in 1995 and designed by Sakari Siitonen

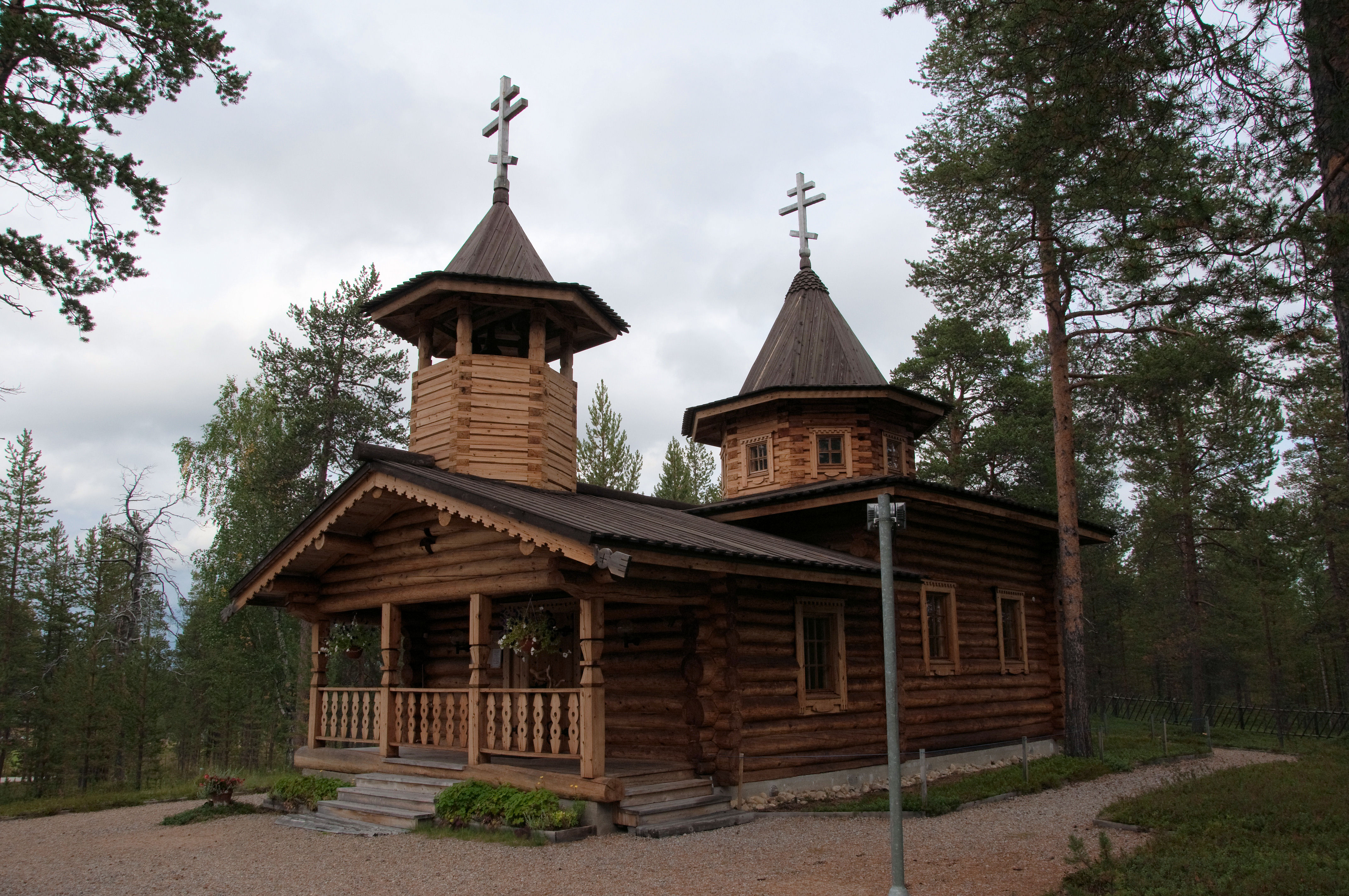
Church of Holy Trinity and St. Tryphon of Pechenga in Nellim, Inari, built as a chapel in 1987 and consecrated as a church in 1988

From the 1990s, some contemporary churches have been built in large cities and towns.

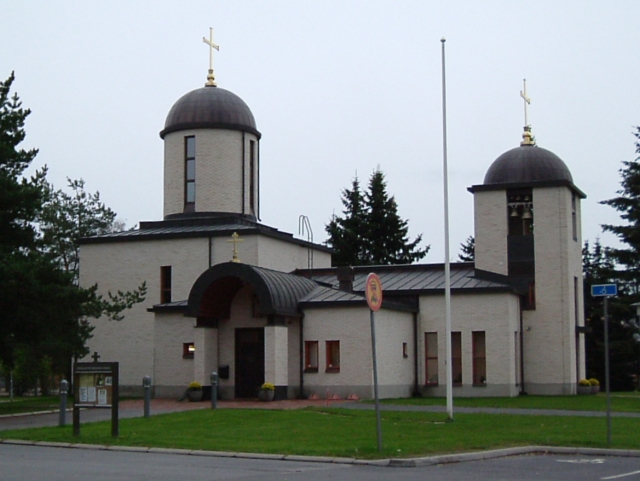
Church of St. John the Theologian in Pori, built 2002

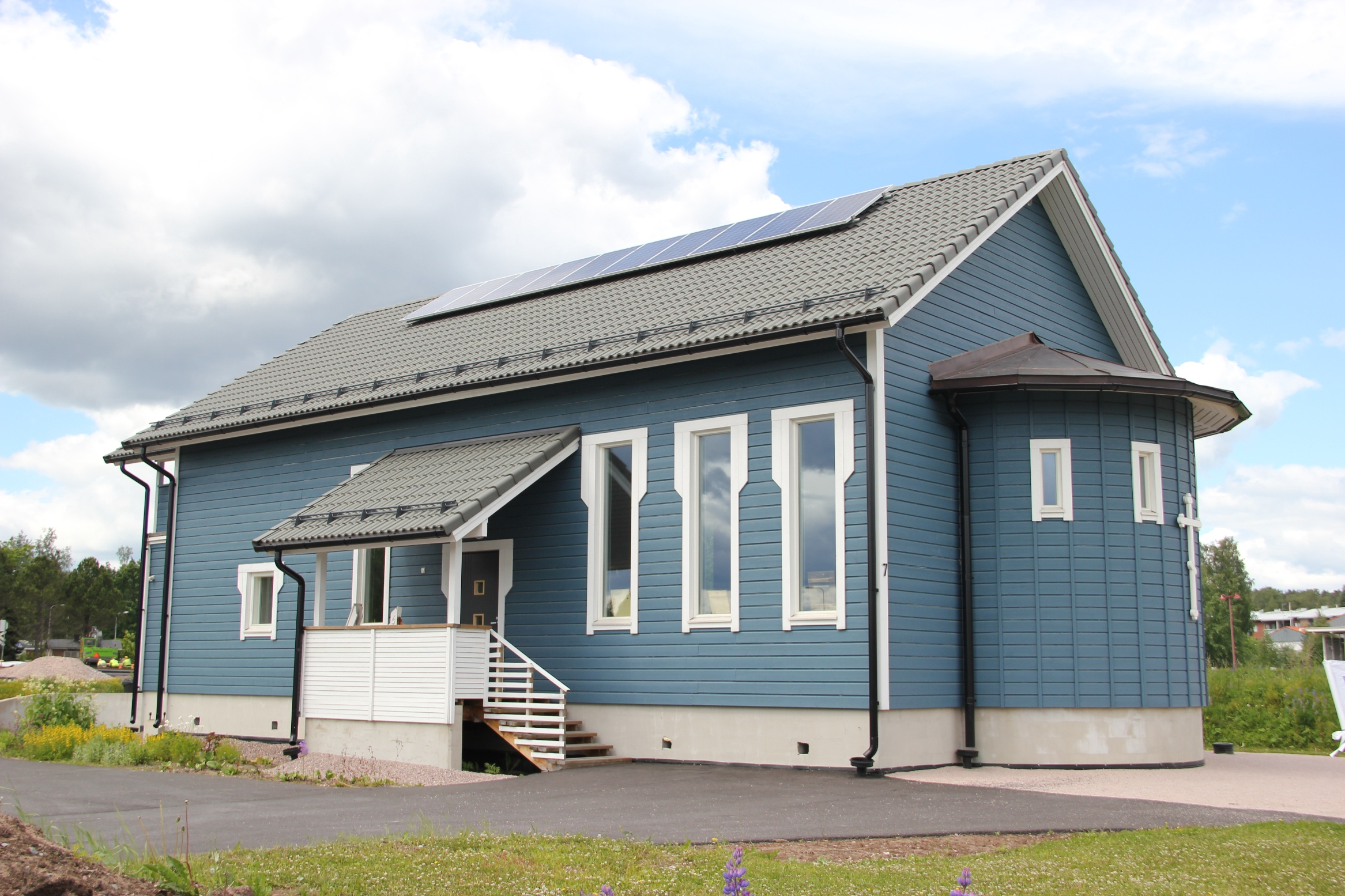
Chapel of Birth of Theotokos in Nummela, built in 1997

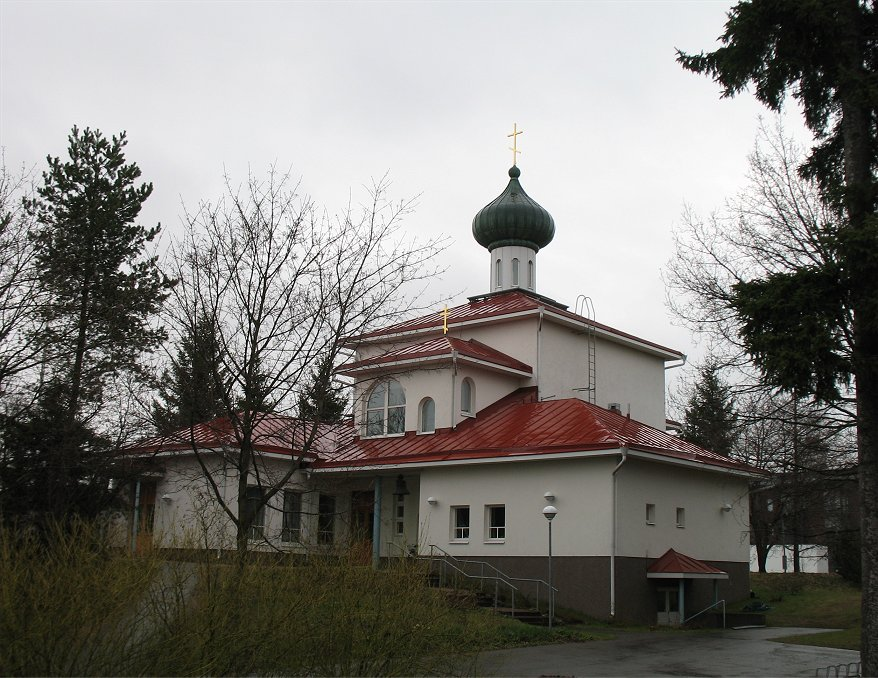
Church of Ascencion of Christ in Tikkurila, Vantaa, built in 1997

== History ==
Christianity started to spread to Finland from the east in the Orthodox form and from the west in the Catholic form at the latest in the beginning of the 12th century. Some of the earliest excavated crosses in Finland, dating from the 12th century onward, are similar to a type found in Novgorod and Kyiv. Orthodox parishes are believed to have existed as far to the west as Tavastia, the area inhabited by Tavastians in Central Finland.

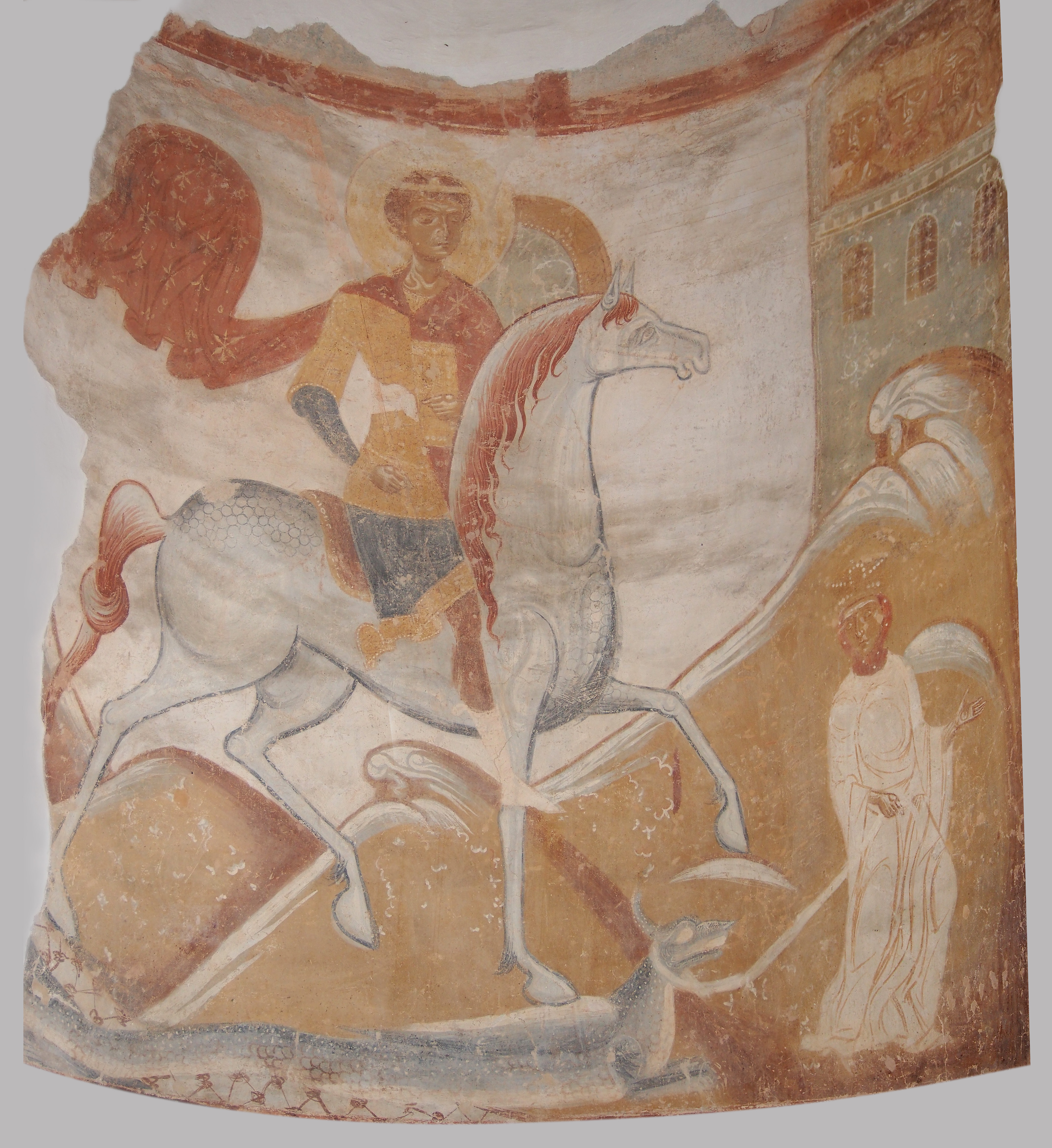
Early Christian art in a territory inhabited by Karelians: fresco painted in 1167 in St. George's church in Staraya Ladoga.

Some core concepts of the Christian vocabulary in the Finnish language are supposed to be loans from early Russian, which in turn has borrowed them from Mediaeval Greek. These include the words for priest (pappi), cross (risti) and Bible (raamattu).

=== Clash between Catholicism and Orthodoxy ===
In the middle of the 13th century the inevitable clash between the two expanding countries, Sweden and Novgorod, and the two forms of Christianity they represented, took place. The final border between Western and Eastern rulership was drawn in the Peace Treaty of Nöteborg, in 1323. Karelia was definitely ceded to Novgorod and Orthodoxy.

=== Karelian monasteries ===
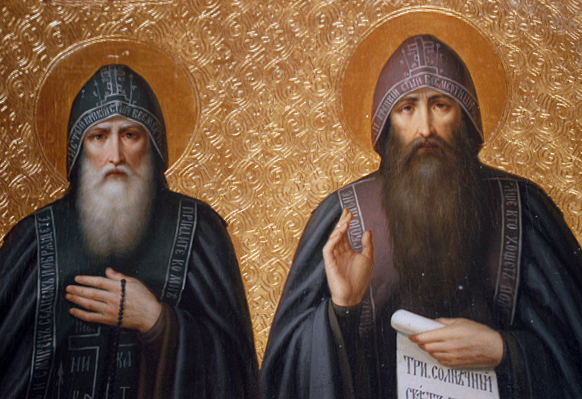
Early 20th-century icon depicting St. Sergius and St. Herman of Valaam.

The main missionary work fell to the monasteries that cropped up in the wilderness of Karelia. Two monasteries were founded on islands in Lake Ladoga, which became famous some centuries later: the monasteries of Valaam (Finnish: Valamo) and Konevsky (Finnish: Konevitsa).

Karelian and Finnish forests were also populated by spiritually advanced hermits. Often around the hermit's hut or skete, there settled other fighters of the good fight of faith, and so a new monastery was founded. One of the most important examples of this process was St. Alexander of Svir (Finnish: Aleksanteri Syväriläinen) 1449–1533. He was a Karelian who fought the fight of faith for 13 years in Valaam monastery, but finally left it, and in the end founded a monastery at the river of Svir.

=== Swedish oppression ===
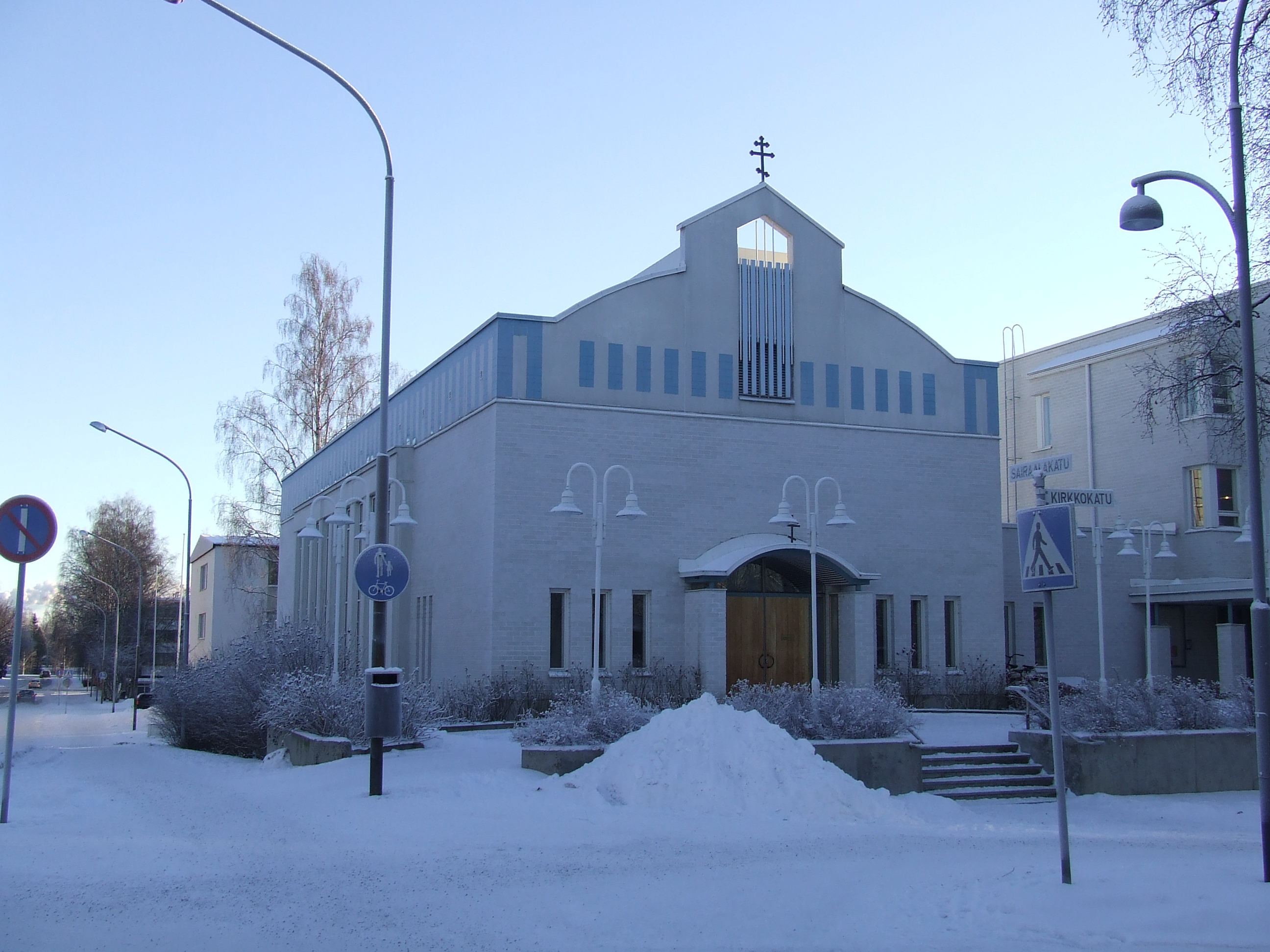
Joensuun Orthodox Parish

The 17th century was a period of religious fanaticism and many religious wars as the newly emerged Protestant countries fought against countries that remained Catholic or Orthodox. At this time Sweden became a great force, expanding both southward and eastward. In Karelia the Swedish forces destroyed and burnt to the ground the monasteries of Valaam and Konevsky. Monks that did not flee, were killed. Many peasants met the same fate.

Karelians mostly identified themselves with the Russians, and not with the Finns. Karelians rather called the Finns "ruotsalaiset," which is the Finnish word for Swedes.

The Lutheran state church of Sweden tried to convert the Orthodox population. They were not allowed to obtain priests from Russia, which meant, in the long run, that they did not have priests at all. As Lutheranism was the only legal religion in Sweden, to be Orthodox was difficult on many levels. About two-thirds of the Orthodox population fled to central Russia from the Swedish oppression. They formed the population of Tver Karelia. The Swedish state encouraged Lutheran Finns to occupy the deserted farms in Karelia. This massive flight of Orthodox Finns away from Finland meant that Eastern Orthodoxy was never again the majority religion of any part of Finland. However, in the remoter areas of Eastern Finland and Karelia, like Ilomantsi, the Eastern Orthodox Christianity survived.

=== Reunion with the Russian Orthodox Church ===
The period of the grandiose expansion of Sweden met its limits in two wars: the Great Northern War which ended in the Treaty of Nystad in 1721 and the Hat's War (1741–43) with the Treaty of Turku in 1743. Sweden lost all its provinces in the Baltic region, and a portion of eastern Finland to Russia.

The Valaam Monastery was re-established in Lake Ladoga, and a new main church was consecrated in 1719. Monks returned to Konevsky Monastery before 1716. The Russian government favoured the activities of the religion they had professed for many centuries. The Emperors and Empresses paid for the reconstruction of burnt or otherwise demolished churches. The Orthodox population of Eastern Finland again had access to making pilgrimages to the monasteries of Solovetsk and Alexander-Svirsky.

The Old Believers, a schismatic group of Russians who did not accept the religious reforms of patriarch Nikon in 1666–67, were excommunicated from the Orthodox Church and fled to the outskirts of Russia. They also moved into the remote areas of Finland building three small monasteries there. However, the activity of these monasteries stopped during the following century.

=== Grand Duchy of Finland ===
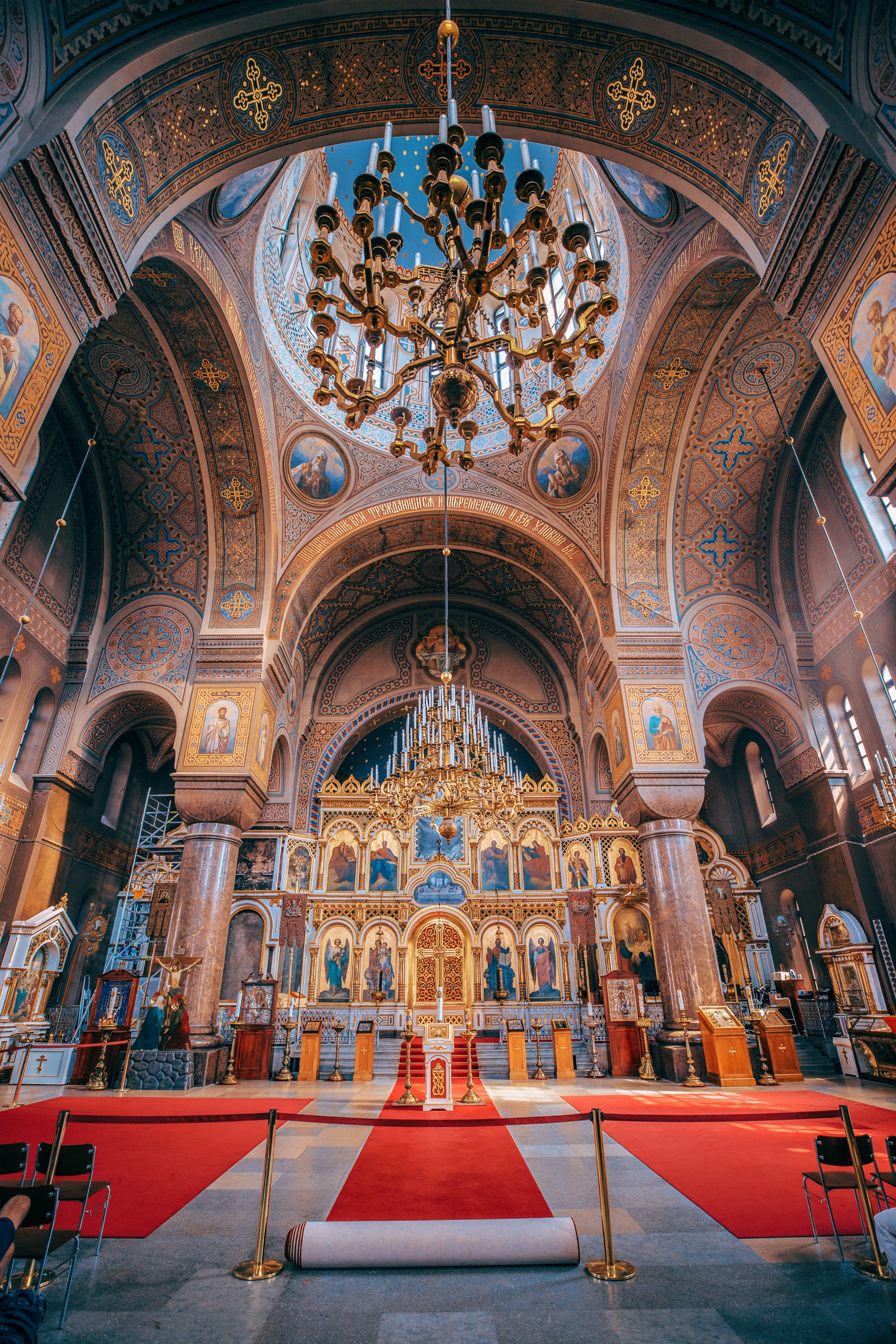
Interior of the Uspenski Cathedral.

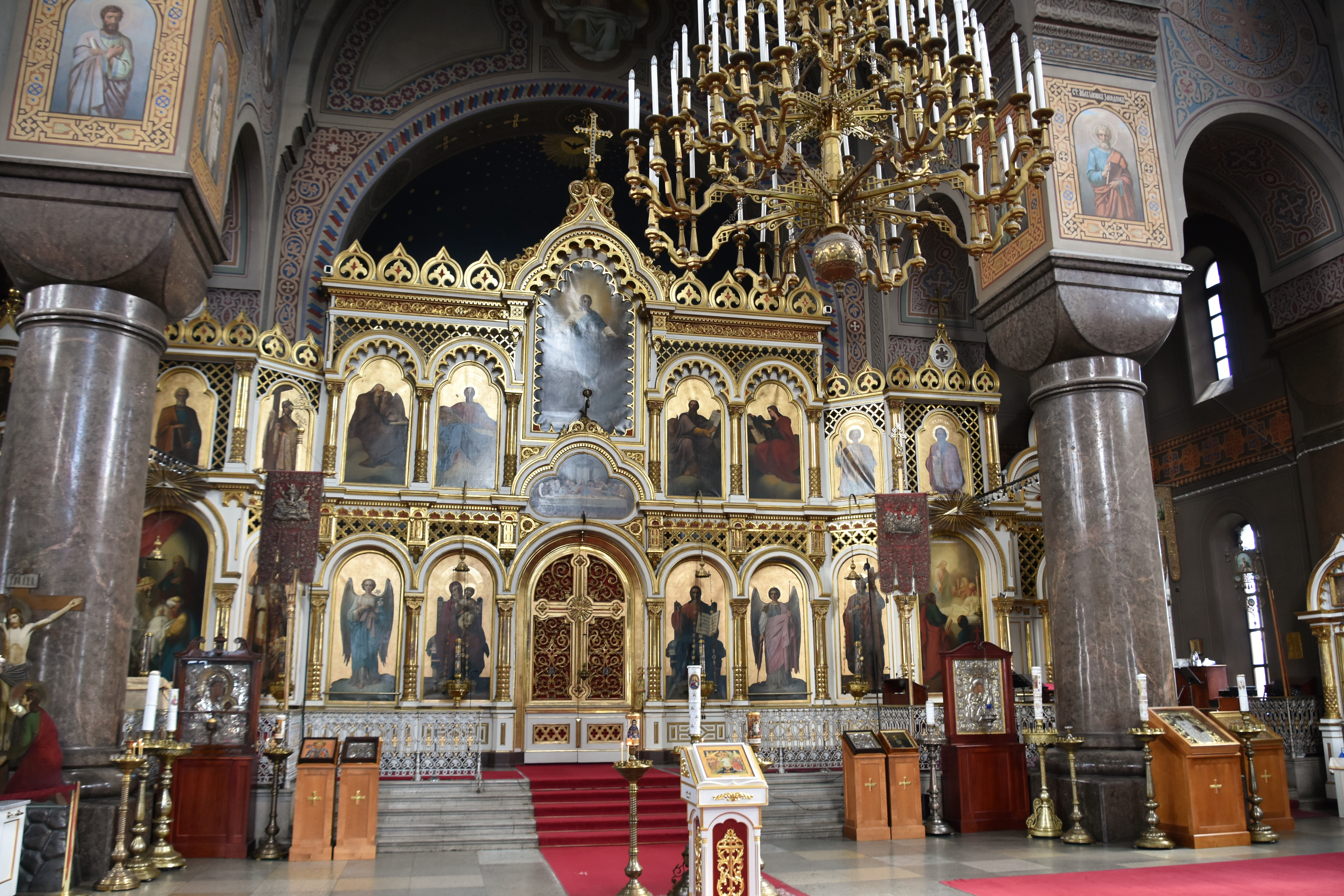
Uspenski Cathedral iconostasis.

When all of Finland became an autonomous grand duchy within the Russian Empire in 1809, it already had an established Lutheran Church. Eastern Orthodox Christianity also gained a recognized status in Finland. The old Swedish constitution which Finns generally regarded as the constitution of the grand duchy, specifically required that the sovereign was Protestant, but this was overlooked regarding the Orthodox Emperors.

In areas where Orthodox faith was not indigenous as in the towns of Helsinki, Tampere and Viipuri and the Karelian Isthmus, Orthodoxy was especially associated with the Russians, most of whom were Russian troops permanently stationed in Finland. The birth of Helsinki's Orthodox Church is generally associated with the construction of the Holy Trinity Church, Helsinki in 1827. Generally most ecclesiastical activity outside Karelia centered on the garrison churches. There were also a growing number of Russian emigrants, most of whom were merchants or craftsmen. These started to identify themselves with the Swedish-speaking bourgeoisie, and so a Swedish-speaking branch of the Finnish Orthodox Church was born.

The 19th century was also a period of active building of new churches, the Uspenski Cathedral being the most important of them. The garrisons needed Orthodox churches and so did the new emigrants to the towns. A good examples are the Orthodox church of Tampere and Turku.

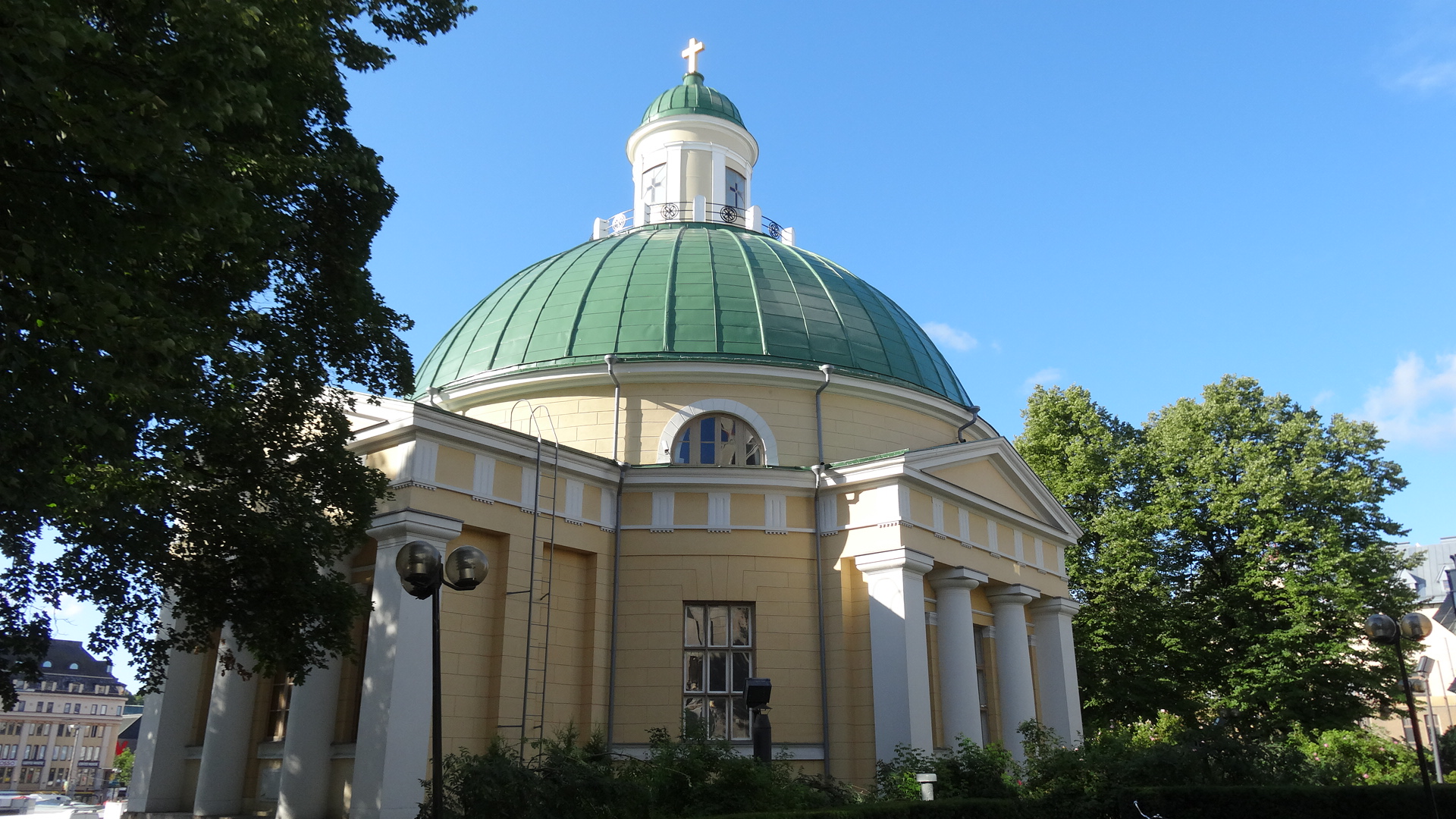
Church of the Holy Martyr Empress Alexandra in Turku, consecrated 9 September 1845.

In the rural countryside of Karelia, the local form of Orthodox faith remained somewhat primitive, incorporating many features of older religious praxis. Literacy among the Orthodox population was low. In 1900 it was estimated that of all persons over the age of 15 in East Finland, 32 percent were illiterate. The Orthodox population knew very little of their faith except the outer forms. The priests were generally Russians who seldom knew Finnish. As Karelia and its arable land was poor, it did not attract first class priests. The language of the services was Church Slavonic, a form of old Bulgarian. A Russian could understand some parts of the services, a Finnish-speaking person nothing.

A separate Finnish episcopate with a leading archbishop was established in 1892 under the Russian Orthodox Church. It was stationed in Vyborg, with the Russian Antoniy as its first bishop.

When Russia at the end of the 19th century tried to retract the autonomy of Finland, the Lutheran Finns started to associate the Orthodox Church with the imperial Russian rule, labeled as the ryssän kirkko. The cultural gap between the two churches remained significant.

=== Republic of Finland ===
Shortly after Finland declared independence from Russia in 1917, the Orthodox Church of Finland declared its autonomy from the Russian Church. Finland's first constitution (1919) granted the Orthodox Church an equal status with the (Lutheran) Church of Finland.

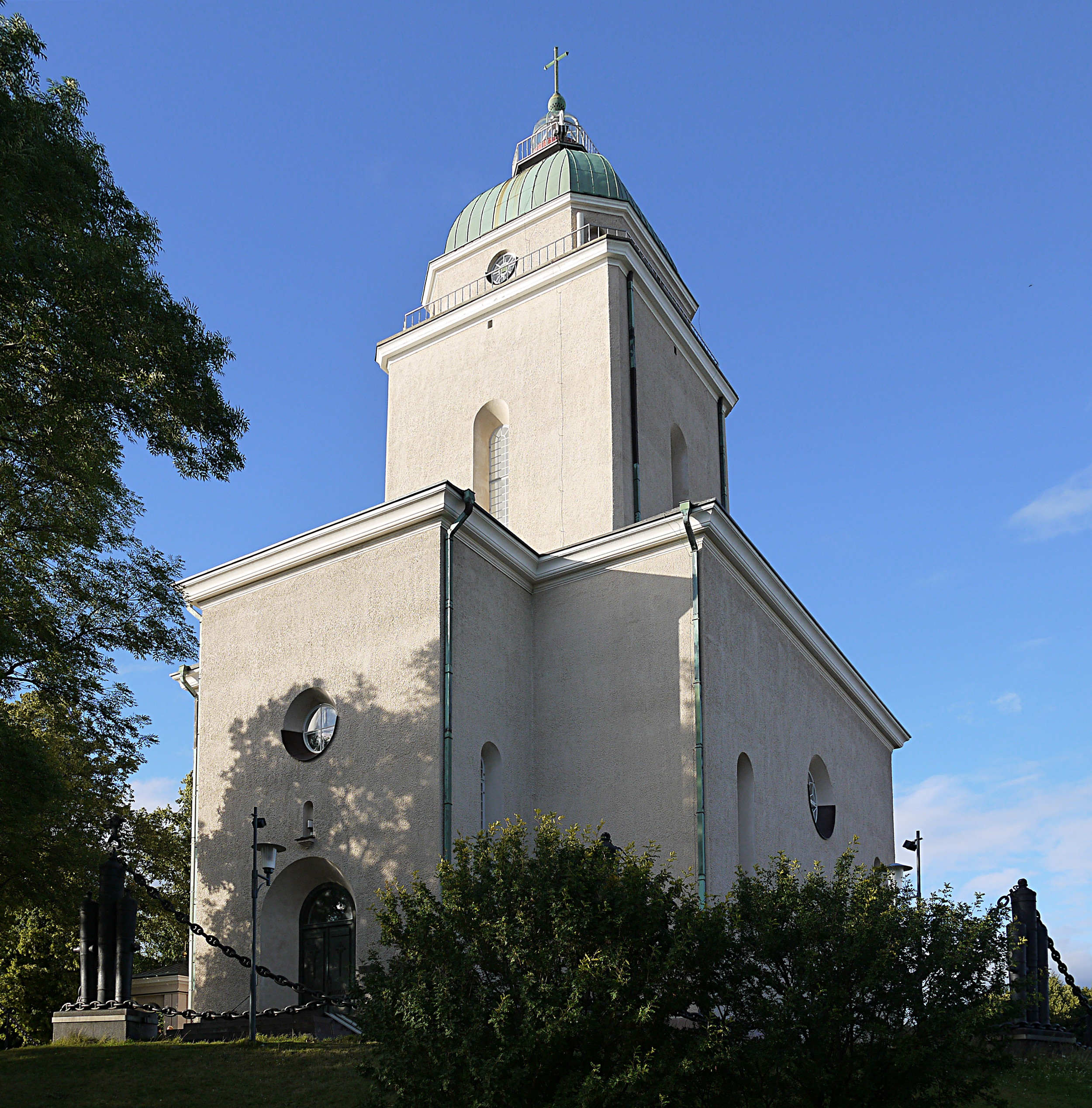
Formerly an Orthodox church, the Suomenlinna Church was turned to Lutheran in 1918.

In 1923, the Orthodox Church of Finland completely separated from the Russian Church, becoming an autonomous church affiliated with the Ecumenical Patriarchate of Constantinople. At the same time the Gregorian Calendar was adopted. Other reforms introduced after independence include changing the language of the liturgy from Church Slavonic to Finnish and the transfer of the Archiepiscopal seat from Viipuri to Sortavala.

Until World War II, the majority of Orthodox Christians in Finland were located in Karelia. As a consequence of the war, residents of the areas ceded to the Soviet Union were evacuated to other parts of the country. The monastery of Valamo was evacuated in 1940 and the monastery of New Valamo was founded in 1941 at Heinävesi, on the Finnish side of the new border. Later, the monks from Konevsky and Petsamo monasteries also joined the New Valamo monastery. The nunnery of Lintula (now Ogonki) near Kivennapa (Karelian Isthmus) was also evacuated, and re-established at Heinävesi in 1946.

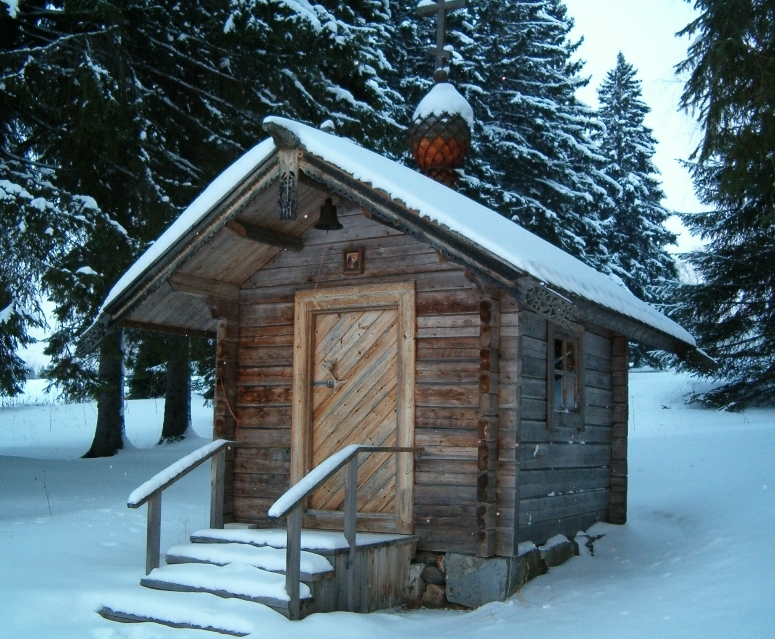
Chapel of Saint Nicholas, private eukteria of New Valamo

A new parish network was established, and many new churches were built in the 1950s. After the cities of Sortavala and Viipuri were lost to the Soviet Union (Viipuri is now Vyborg, Russia), the archiepiscopal seat was moved to Kuopio and the diocesan seat of Viipuri was moved to Helsinki. A third diocese was established in Oulu in 1979.

After the Second World War the membership of the Orthodox Church in Finland decreased slowly, as the Karelian evacuees were settled far from their roots among the Lutheran majority of Finland. Mixed marriages became common and the children were often baptized into the religion of the majority. But quite unexpectedly a "romantic" movement arose in Finland beginning in the 1970s onward glorifying Orthodoxy, its "mystical" and visually beautiful services and icons (religious paintings) and its deeper view of Christianity than that of the Lutheran Church. For these reasons, similar to Catholicism in England, conversion to the Orthodox Church became almost a fad, and its membership started to grow.

At the same time Archbishop Paavali of Karelia and All Finland (1960–1987) made liturgical changes to the services, that gave the laity a more active role in the church services, and made the services more open (earlier the clergy stayed behind a curtain for part of the services) and intelligible. Archbishop Paavali also stressed the importance of partaking in the Eucharist as often as possible.

In the 2010s, church membership has begun to decrease due to membership resignations and the declining number of baptisms. Compared to the membership trends of the Finnish Lutheran Church, members who resign from the Orthodox Church are on average slightly older and more likely to be female than those resigning from the Lutheran Church.

== Russian Orthodox Church in Finland ==
Roughly 4,200 Orthodox Christians in Finland belong to the Russian Orthodox Church (Moscow Patriarchate), which is not connected to the Orthodox Church of Finland. Unlike the Orthodox Church of Finland, the Russian Orthodox Church in Finland follows the Julian calendar.

== List of archbishops ==
Under Patriarchate of Moscow:

- Antoniy (1892–1898)
- Nikolay (1899–1905)
- Sergiy (1905–1917)
- Serafim (1918–1923), Bishop of Finland from 1918 and archbishop from 1921

Under Ecumenical Patriarchate of Constantinople:

- Herman (1923–1960)
- Paavali ("Paul") (1960–1987)
- Johannes ("John") (1987–2001)
- Leo (2001–2024)
- Elia (2024–present)

== See also ==
- Religion in Finland
- Christianity in Finland
- Catholic Church in Finland
- Russian Orthodox Church in Finland
