= Sergius Rajapolvi =

His Grace Sergei
- Bishop of Hamina
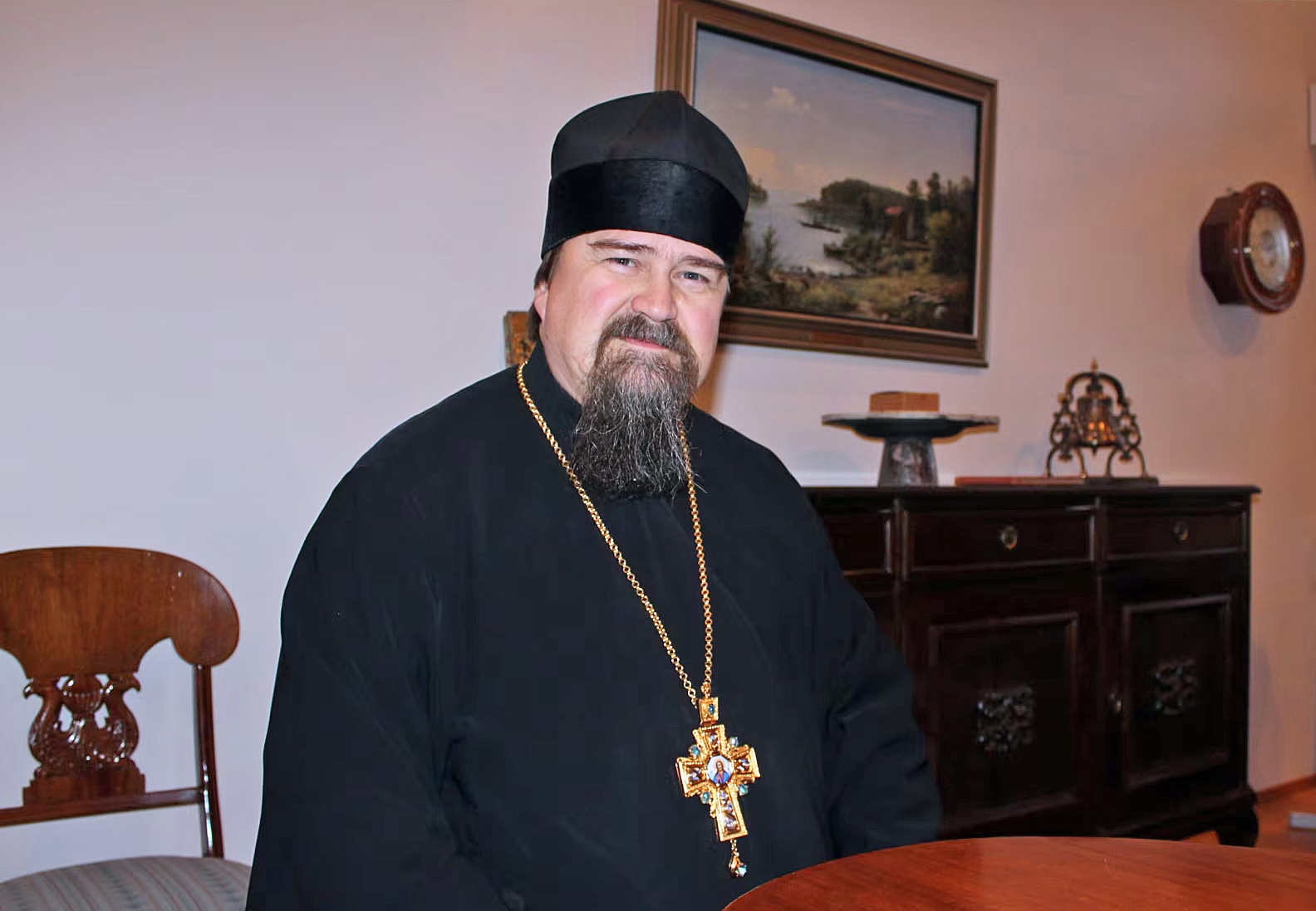
- Native name: Sergei Rajapolvi
- Church: Orthodox Church of Finland
- Appointed: 16 January 2022
- Predecessor: See created

Orders
- Ordination: 1995 by John (Rinne)
- Consecration: 16 January 2022 by Leo (Makkonen)

Personal details
- Born: Sergei Rajapolvi; 23 April 1965 (age 61) Viinijärvi, North Karelia, Finland
- Denomination: Eastern Orthodox Christianity
- Education: University of Joensuu

Bishop Sergius (Finnish: Piispa Sergei, secular name: Yrjö Rajapolvi) (b. April 23, 1965, Viinijärvi, North Karelia, Finland) is the Vicar Bishop under the Archbishop of Helsinki and All Finland of the Orthodox Church of Finland (Patriarchate of Constantinople), with the title of Bishop of Hamina. He was consecrated in January 2022. Before this, he served as the hegumen of the New Valamo monastery during 1997–2011 and 2012–2021).

== Biography ==
Sergei was born on April 23, 1965, in the village Viinijärvi, which is 40 km from New Valaam, in a Karelian family with four sons. His father was Orthodox, his mother was a Lutheran from North Karelia. His grandmother and grandfather bore the surname Gordeyev, which in the 1920s they changed to Finnish in the wake of de-Russification. He was baptized into Orthodoxy at the age of one month. At the age of three, he lost his father. The Orthodox activist Eino Hartikainen, who lived in their village, and Hieromonk Sergei (Leimu), a resident of the New Valaam Monastery, had a great influence on the upbringing of the boy. He visited the church of the Theotokos of Tikhvin in his native village.

In 1984 he graduated from the Pieksämäki Gymnasium and entered the Kuopio Theological Seminary, from which he graduated in 1988 (the last year of his stay in Kuopio). From 1988 to 1989 he served in the Finnish army, during which time he received the training of a military pastor. Then he continued his studies at the Orthodox Theological Faculty of the University of Joensuu, from which he graduated in 1990 as an Orthodox teacher of religion.

In July 1990 he entered the brotherhood of the New Valaam Monastery in Heinävesi, where in December 1991 he was tonsured a rassophore by Archimandrite Panteleimon (Sarho), and in March 1992 he became a monk with the name Sergius after Saint Sergius of Valaam. In 1992 Bishop Ambrosius (Jääskeläinen) of Joensuu ordained him as a hierodeacon, and in 1995 Archbishop John (Rinne) of Finland ordained him a hieromonk.

== As Hegumen of the New Valaam Monastery ==
In 1997 he was elected and approved as the Hegumen of the New Valaam Monastery. He heads the Society of Friends of Valaam (Fin. Valamon Ystävät ry) and the Orthodox Brotherhood (Fin. Ortodoksinen Veljestö ry).

On November 9, 2011, by decree of Archbishop Leo (Makkonen) of Karelia and all Finland, he was relieved of his post as hegumen due to the financial condition of the monastery, as well as due to disagreements between the rector and commercial director of the monastery, Veikko Halonen.

The brethren of the monastery (4 people) expressed support for the decision of the archbishop. The monastics and novices expressed their desire to see a new hegumen as the head of the monastery, since “Hegumen Sergei has lost our confidence,” the statement said.

Defenders of the dismissed hegumen filed a complaint with the Finnish Chancellor of Justice against the actions of Archbishop Leo, noting that Archbishop Leo violated the charter of the monastery, and also put pressure on the hegumen, demanding that he himself resign for health reasons.

At the opening of the church council of the Finnish archdiocese, Archbishop Leo of Karelia and all Finland, commenting on the issue of the dismissal of the hegumen of the only male monastery in the country, noted that there were “good reasons” for the dismissal of Hegumen Sergei and “there was no alternative” to resolve the situation in a different way.

On November 8, 2012, the Deputy Chancellor of Justice of Finland, Mikko Puumalainen, reprimanded Archbishop Leo: according to the law, he did not have the right to single-handedly dismiss the hegumen of the Valaam Monastery, whose post is for life.

On November 22, 2012, he was reinstated by Archbishop Leo as hegumen of the New Valaam Monastery.

== Episcopacy ==
On November 23, 2021, the Bishops' Council nominated Sergei as the only candidate for election to the vicar bishop's position of the Helsinki Diocese. On November 25, in the vote of the members of the Council of the Orthodox Church in the New Valaam Monastery, he was elected for ordination as Bishop of Hamina, Vicar Bishop of the Archdiocese of Helsinki.

On January 15, 2022, the rite of naming the bishop took place at the Uspenski Cathedral.

On January 16, 2022, his episcopal consecration took place in the Uspenski Cathedral. The consecration was performed by Archbishop Leo (Makkonen) of Helsinki and all Finland, Metropolitan Arseni (Heikkinen) of Kuopio and Metropolitan Elia (Wallgrén) of Oulu. Bishop Nazarius (Lavrinenko) of Kronstadt was present at the service as an official representative of the Russian Orthodox Church.

His duties as the Vicar Bishop of the Archdiocese of Helsinkí include publishing work, inner mission, multicultural work, youth work and education.

After the election former of Metropolitan of Oulu Elia (Wallgrén) as Archbishop of Helsinki and All Finland, Bishop Sergei took over the duties of the Metropolitan of Oulu on 1 January 2025 until the election of a new metropolitan.
