= Archbishop of the Orthodox Church of Finland =

Finnish Eastern Orthodox archbishopric

Archbishop of Helsinki and all Finland
- Archbishopric

Eastern Orthodox
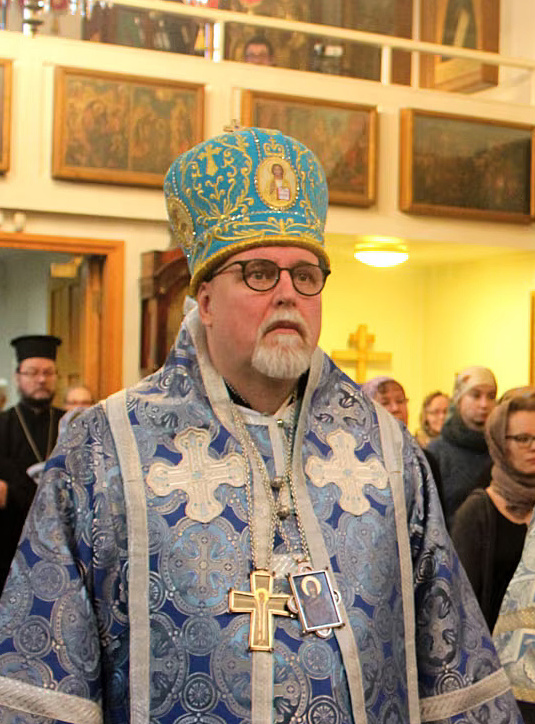
- Incumbent; Elia; Since 1 December 2024
- Style: His Eminence

Location
- Country: Finland
- Ecclesiastical region: Southern Finland
- Headquarters: Liisankatu 29 A 13

Information
- First holder: Seraphim as archbishop of Vyborg and Finland; Leo as archbishop of Helsinki and all Finland
- Cathedral: Uspenski Cathedral

Website
- Official website

The Archbishop of Helsinki and all Finland is the primate of the Orthodox Church of Finland. Following the establishment of the church as an autonomous archdiocese under the Ecumenical Patriarchate in 1923, its primate held the title Archbishop of Karelia and all Finland until 2018.

The Archbishop of Finland is elected by the Church Council of the Finnish Orthodox Church. The council consists of 34 to 35 voting members: all working bishops (currently 3), 11 clergy representatives, 3 cantors, and 18 elected lay representatives.
