= Alexey Rantala =

Eastern Orthodox bishops (1941–1984)

His Grace Aleksi
- Bishop of Joensuu
- Native name: Aleksi Rantala
- Church: Orthodox Church of Finland
- See: Joensuu
- Installed: 2 March 1980
- Term ended: 22 January 1984
- Predecessor: Leo (Makkonen)
- Successor: Ambrosius (Jääskeläinen)

Orders
- Ordination: 1980
- Consecration: 2 March 1980

Personal details
- Born: Pertti Rantala; 13 April 1941 Liperi, Finland
- Died: 22 January 1984 (aged 42) Joensuu, Finland
- Buried: New Valaam monastery
- Denomination: Eastern Orthodox Christianity

Bishop Alexey (Finnish: Piispa Aleksi, secular name Pertti Rantala) (b. 13 April 1941, Liperi, Finland – d. 22 January 1984, Joensuu, Finland) was a Vicar Bishop of the Orthodox Church of Finland. He held the titular see of Joensuu under the Archbishop of Karelia and All Finland from 1980 until his death in 1984.

== Youth ==
Pertti Rantala was born 13 April 1941 in Northern Karelian village of Korpivaara in the Liperi municipality. His parents Aleksi and Anna Rantala were Karelian refugees from the Impilahti municipality on the northern coast of Lake Ladoga. He completed his primary and secondary education in Heinävesi and then afterwards studied at and graduated from the Niittylahti high school.

== Work in the Church ==
In 1960, he started theological studies at the Orthodox Theological Seminary of Finland. He graduated from there in 1966 and then got work as the teacher of the Orthodox Religion in the Jyväskylä area. He worked there until 1973, after which he went to work as the traveling cantor in the Ilomantsi area. In 1977, he started studies of Russian language and literature in the Joensuu university.

== Episcopacy ==
In January 1980, he was elected to be the Vicar Bishop for the Archbishop of Karelia and All Finland with the titular see of Joensuu. He was then quickly tonsured as a monk and then ordained to the diaconate and the priesthood back to back. Finally in March 1980, he was consecrated in the Kuopio Saint Nicholas Cathedral. He represented the Church of Finland in some international meetings, namely in the 1981 doctrinal negotiations between the Orthodox and Old Catholics in Moscow, and in the 1982 preliminary meetings for the Holy and Great Synod in Switzerland.

== Illness and death ==
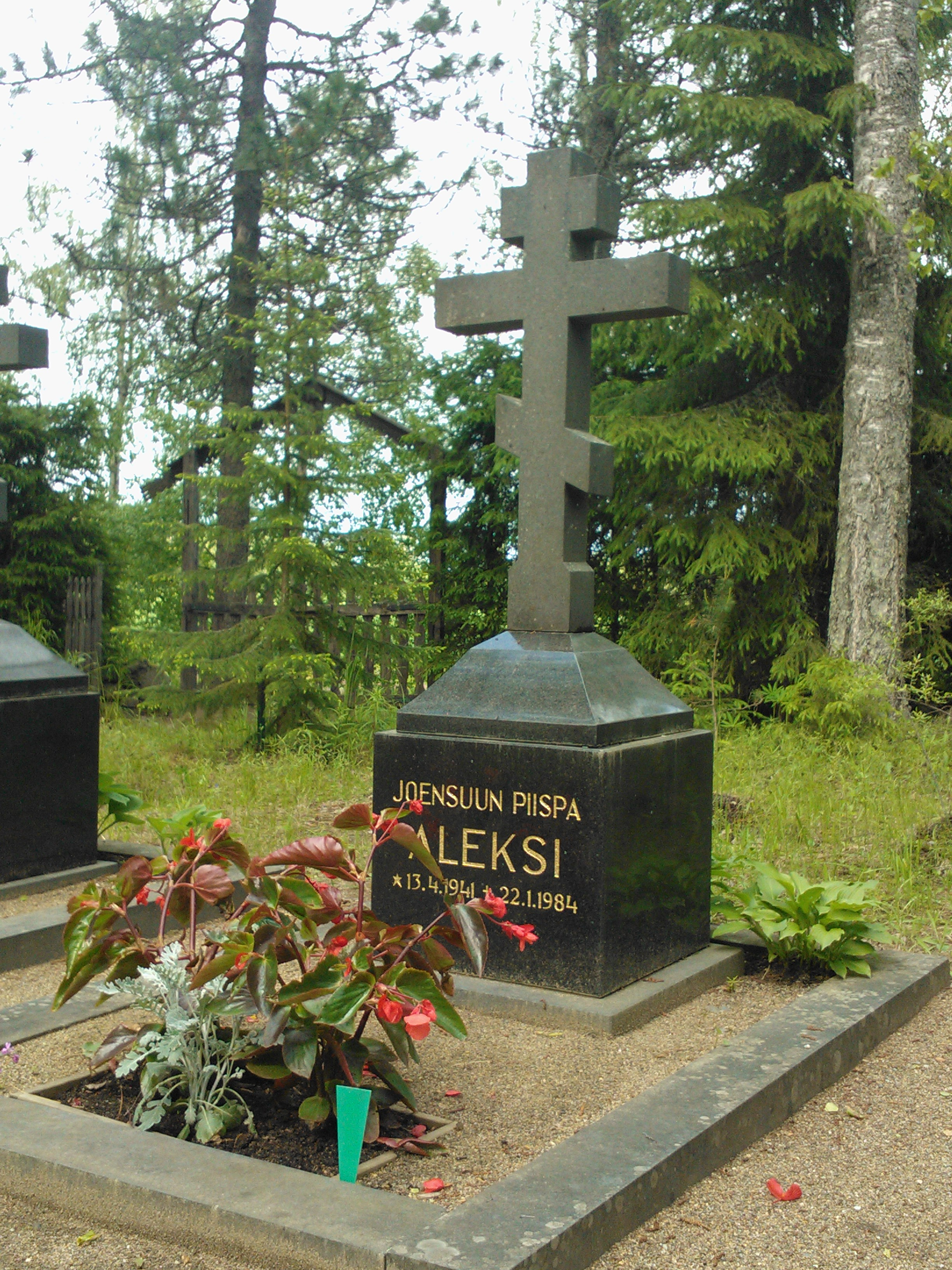
The tomb of bishop Alexey in the New Valaam Monastery.

In the spring of 1983, he was diagnosed with an aggressive lymphoma. It was operated in radical surgery, but it was found that the cancer had already metastasized in the internal organs. He spent a large part of the year 1983 in solitude in the New Valaam Monastery. Bishop Alexey died in his Joensuu residence in the evening of 22 January 1984. Later he was buried by the bishops of the Orthodox Church of Finland in the New Valaam Monastery cemetery.
