= Metropolitan of Oulu =

Bishop of the Oulu Metropolis of the Orthodox Church of Finland

- Oulun metropoliitta
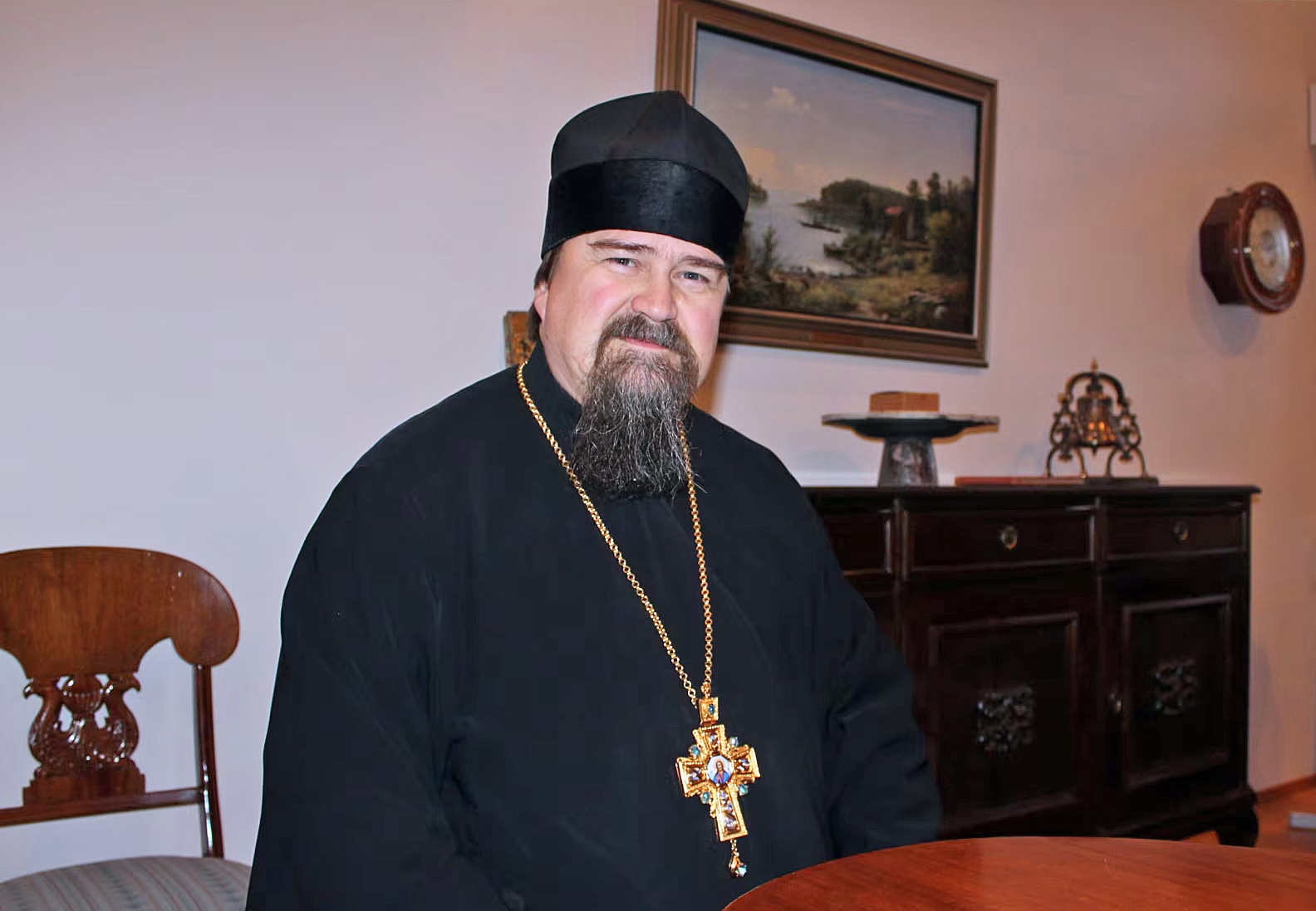
- Incumbent; Sergei (Rajapolvi); Acting since 1.1.2025
- Appointer: Local Council of the Orthodox church of Finland with confirmation of the Council of Bishops
- Term length: Lifetime
- First holder: Leo (Makkonen)
- Website: https://ort.fi/oulunhiippakunta/

Metropolitan of Oulu is the title of the Orthodox bishop of the Oulu Diocese of the Orthodox Church of Finland. The position was created in 1980, when the diocese was created.

== History ==
When Archimandrite Elia was ordained as the Metropolitan of Oulu on January 11, 2015, the Orthodox Church of Finland received a new bishop at the Holy Trinity Cathedral of Oulu. The Archbishop Leo (Makkonen) of Karelia and All Finland were present at the ordination and installation. There was over 300 visitors from all over Finland who participated in the event.

Metropolitans of Oulu
| Name | Years served |
| Leo (Makkonen) | 1980–1996 |
| Ambrosius (Jääskeläinen) | 1996–2002 |
| Panteleimon (Sarho) | 2002–2013 |
| Elia (Wallgrén) | 2015–2024 |
