= Elia Wallgrén =

Finnish Orthodox religious leader (born 1961)

His Eminence Elia
- Archbishop of Helsinki and All Finland
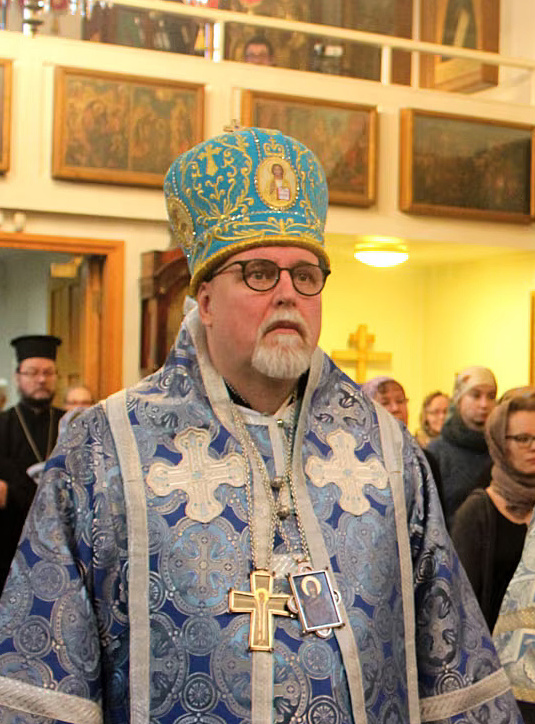
- Native name: Elia Wallgrén
- Church: Orthodox Church of Finland
- Appointed: 1 December 2024
- Predecessor: Leo (Makkonen)
- Previous post: Metropolitan of Oulu (2015–2024)

Orders
- Ordination: 1 September 2003 by Leo (Makkonen)
- Consecration: 11 January 2015 by Leo (Makkonen)

Personal details
- Born: Matti Halme; 8 December 1961 (age 64) Kajaani, Finland
- Denomination: Orthodox Christianity
- Profession: bishop, priest, teacher
- Education: Master of Divinity
- Alma mater: University of Stockholm; Saint Vladimir's Orthodox Theological Seminary; University of Joensuu

Archbishop Elia (secular name: Elia Wallgrén; formerly Matti Veli Juhani Wallgrén; born 8 December 1961, Kajaani, Finland) is the current archbishop of the Orthodox Church of Finland since 1 December 2024. His cathedral is the Uspenski Cathedral in Helsinki. Previously, he served as the Metropolitan of Oulu and was consecrated on 11 January 2015.

== Background ==
Wallgrén’s both parents were Karelians, his father was from Kivennapa and his mother from Sortavala. In the Continuation War his father served as in armed reconnaissance behind enemy lines from the age of 17. His mother was Orthodox, and his father joined the Eastern Orthodox Church in his old age.

== Studies ==
Wallgrén matriculated in the town of Kajaani. After this he studied at Stockholm University, his subjects being Swedish and Czech languages and phonetics. He also studied pedagogy and became a teacher for a comprehensive school in Stockholm. He lived in Sweden for eight years. He also lived in the Czech Republic for two years, working as a guide.

Wallgrén joined the Orthodox church in Espoo in 1994. “There was no other alternative.” For him, the Lutheran church did not feel like a spiritual home, and he had not even gone to confirmation school.

In 1996, he started his studies in theology in University of Joensuu, where he studied for five years. He also sang in the church choir and acted as reader in services.

In 2001 he transferred to the Saint Vladimir's Orthodox Theological Seminary in Crestwood, New York. He completed the degree of Master of Divinity there.

== Priesthood ==
Metropolitan Ambrosius (Jääskeläinen) ordained Wallgrén a deacon in the St. Herman of Alaska Church in Espoo on 29 May 2003.

Archbishop Leo (Makkonen) ordained Wallgrén a priest in Jyväskylä Church of Resurrection of Christ on 1 September 2003, after which he was assigned to that church.

During 2003–2006 Wallgrén served as a priest in the Jyväskylä Orthodox Parish, and during 2006–2014 he worked as the vicar of the Vaasa Orthodox Parish. Wallgrén was the only priest of his vast parish, and he has said that he drove 45,000 km every year.

== Election to episcopacy ==
Wallgrén was elected the new metropolitan of Oulu in New Valamo in a church council in November 2014. He was a surprise candidate and was not present himself in the election. The church council selected three persons as candidates, and the council of bishops chose two of them for the final election. In the final election, Wallgrén received 17 votes and Vicar Bishop Arseni (Heikkinen) of Joensuu received 16 votes. One delegate left an empty ballot.

The election caused some polemics afterwards. The church council had no information on Wallgrén prior to the election, not even a curriculum vitae, even though it was said that Wallgrén had given his consent to his candidacy two weeks prior to the election. It was also said that in practice the delegates from the Helsinki Diocese elected the new bishop, since the other two dioceses have so few delegates that they would not form a majority. Archbishop Leo complained that the new bishop came as if from “behind a tree”.

I have said it earlier and can also say in this context that I really wish that in such important matters as elections of bishops the suggestions should be on the table of the church council well prior to the handling of these questions — not on the last night, and not at night — not as a surprise in the church council. The documents should be presented at least weeks if not for months earlier, and even that is not enough. The matter should be presented to the church members, to the media and through other means, so that people can be mentally prepared somehow and so that their thoughts can mature on the subject, and on what kind of decision might be made. Things is this nature should not come — as the saying goes — from behind a tree. … I think that here in Helsinki, a certain group of people have been blinded by their own speed.

The igumen of the New Valamo monastery, Archimandrite Sergei tonsured Wallgrén a monk, with the name of Elia, in honour of Prophet Elia of Tisbe. The following day in Valamo, he was elevated to the rank of archimandrite by Metropolitan Panteleimon (Sarho).

== Episcopacy ==
Elia was consecrated a bishop in Oulu on 11 January 2015. The consecration was by Archbishop Leo (Makkonen) of Karelia and All Finland, and he was assisted by the other four Finnish bishops.

In January 2015, Metropolitan Elia travelled to Constantinople, where Archbishop Leo introduced him to Patriarch Bartholomew I .

In November 2024 Metropolitan Elia was elected Archbishop of Helsinki and All Finland after the retirement of Archbishop Leo (Makkonen). He was enthroned on December 15 by Metropolitan Arsenios (Kardamakis) of Austria.

On 22 January 2026, there was an incident between Boris Bojović and Elia, during a trip to Rome. Bojović claimed to have met with Elia, which he used to claim that Elia supported the non-canonical Montenegrin Orthodox Church, of which Bojović is the disputed metropolitan. Elia refuted the idea that they had met, claiming instead that they had been together briefly during a gathering, during which time a picture was taken.

== Views on Russia ==
After Russia invaded Ukraine in 2022 the relations between the Finnish Orthodox Church and the Russian Orthodox Church have been in a state “deep freezing”. According to Elia, this situation might continue as it is for several decades. In order for the situation to change, Ukraine must be granted sovereignty, and Russia must be convicted of war crimes. In addition, the aggressor must engage in self-examination. “Even within the Russian Church, there must be repentance and an apology.” But Russia is unlikely to repent, Elia has stated. “A change in our relations may not take place in my lifetime,” he told Suomen Kuvalehti in 2026.

== Personal life ==
Metropolitan Elia speaks many languages. Along with his native Finnish, he can also speak Swedish, English, Czech, German, Spanish and some Estonian, Polish and Russian.

== See also ==
- Orthodoxy
- Bishop
- Metropolitan Bishop
- Metropolitan of Oulu

Preceded by Leo (Makkonen)	Archbishop of Karelia and All Finland; 2024 – present	Succeeded by Incumbent
