= Panteleimon Sarho =

His Eminence Panteleimon
- Metropolitan of Oulu
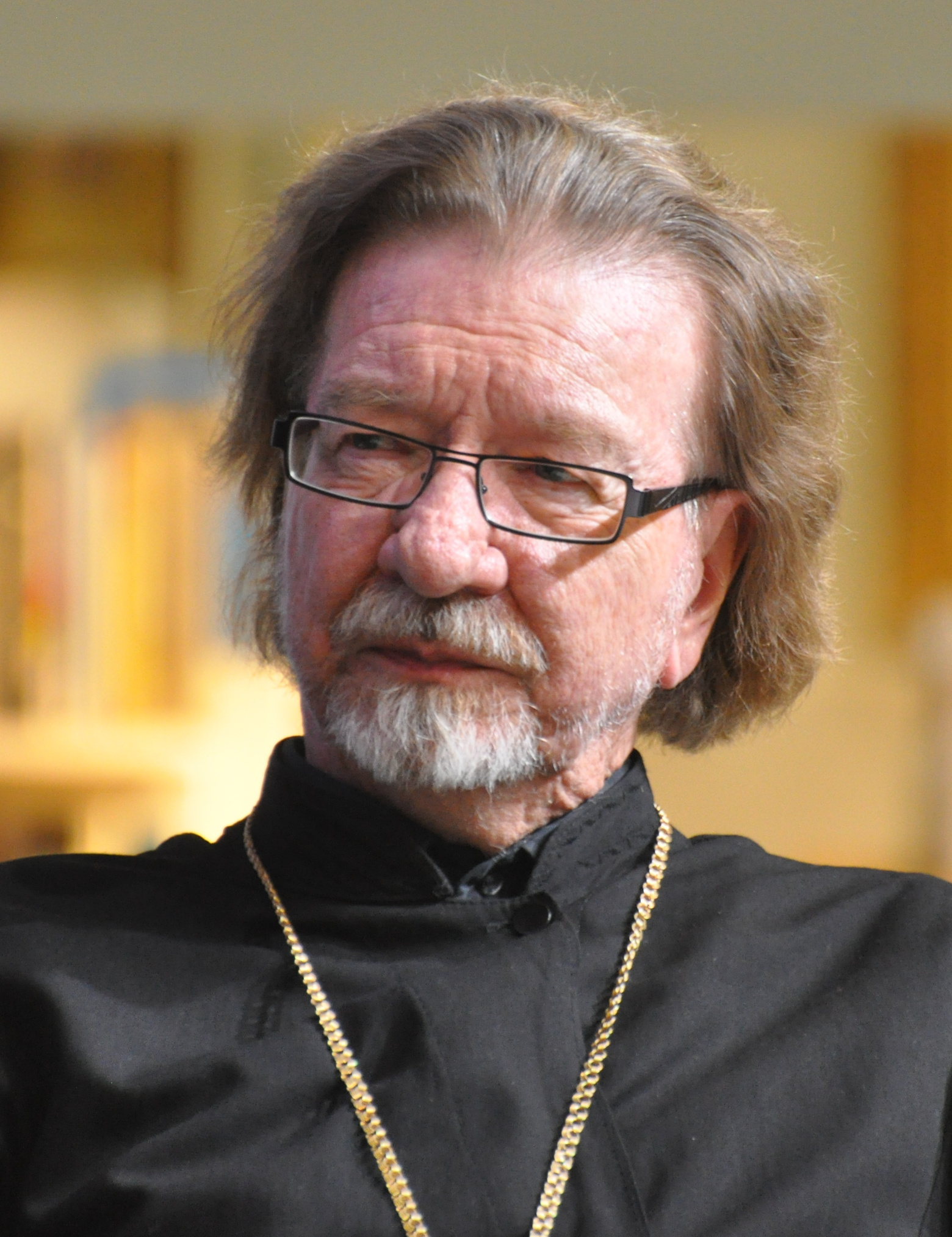
- Panteleimon in 2017.
- Church: Orthodox Church of Finland
- See: Oulu
- Installed: 1 April 2002
- Term ended: 1 June 2013
- Predecessor: Ambrosius (Jääskeläinen)
- Successor: Elia (Wallgrén)
- Previous post: Bishop of Joensuu (1997-2002)

Orders
- Ordination: 1977
- Consecration: 16 March 1997

Personal details
- Born: Petri Sarho; 17 May 1949 (age 77) Vieremä, Finland
- Denomination: Eastern Orthodox Christianity
- Education: Leningrad Spiritual Academy

Metropolitan Panteleimon (Secular name: Petri Sarho) (b. 17 May 1949, Vieremä, Finland) is a retired bishop of the Orthodox Church of Finland and a writer. He was Metropolitan of Oulu before his retirement in June 2013.

== Youth ==
He matriculated in 1969 and began his studies at the Orthodox Seminary of Kuopio, from which he graduated in 1972. He completed postgraduate studies at the Leningrad Spiritual Academy in the Soviet Union, where he graduated with a bachelor's degree in theology in 1977.

== Work in the Church ==
In 1973 and 1975, Panteleimon worked as a travelling cantor in the Ilomantsi district. He was tonsured a monk, then ordained a hierodeacon and a hieromonk in 1977, when he also became a member of the brotherhood of the New Valamo Monastery. In New Valaam, he served as the head of the monastery, or hegumen, from 1979 to 1997. He was awarded the title of Archimandrite in 1986.

In 1997, he was elected Auxiliary Bishop of the Orthodox Church of Finland with the title Bishop of Joensuu. The consecration as a bishop took place in Kuopio in March 1997. He was locum tenes of the Diocese of Helsinki for two months at the turn of the year 2001–2002. In April 2002, he was elected Bishop of the Diocese of Oulu with the title of Metropolitan of Oulu.

Panteleimon was a member of the General Synod of the Orthodox Church of Finland, first from 1986 to 1992 and then as a member in his own right from 1997 until his retirement.

== Publications ==
Panteleimon has written numerous articles and books and historical novels in Finnish on Valaam and the Orthodox faith. He has also written a non-fiction history book of the Pechenga monastery.
