= Arseni Heikkinen =

His Eminence Arseni
- Metropolitan of Kuopio and Karelia
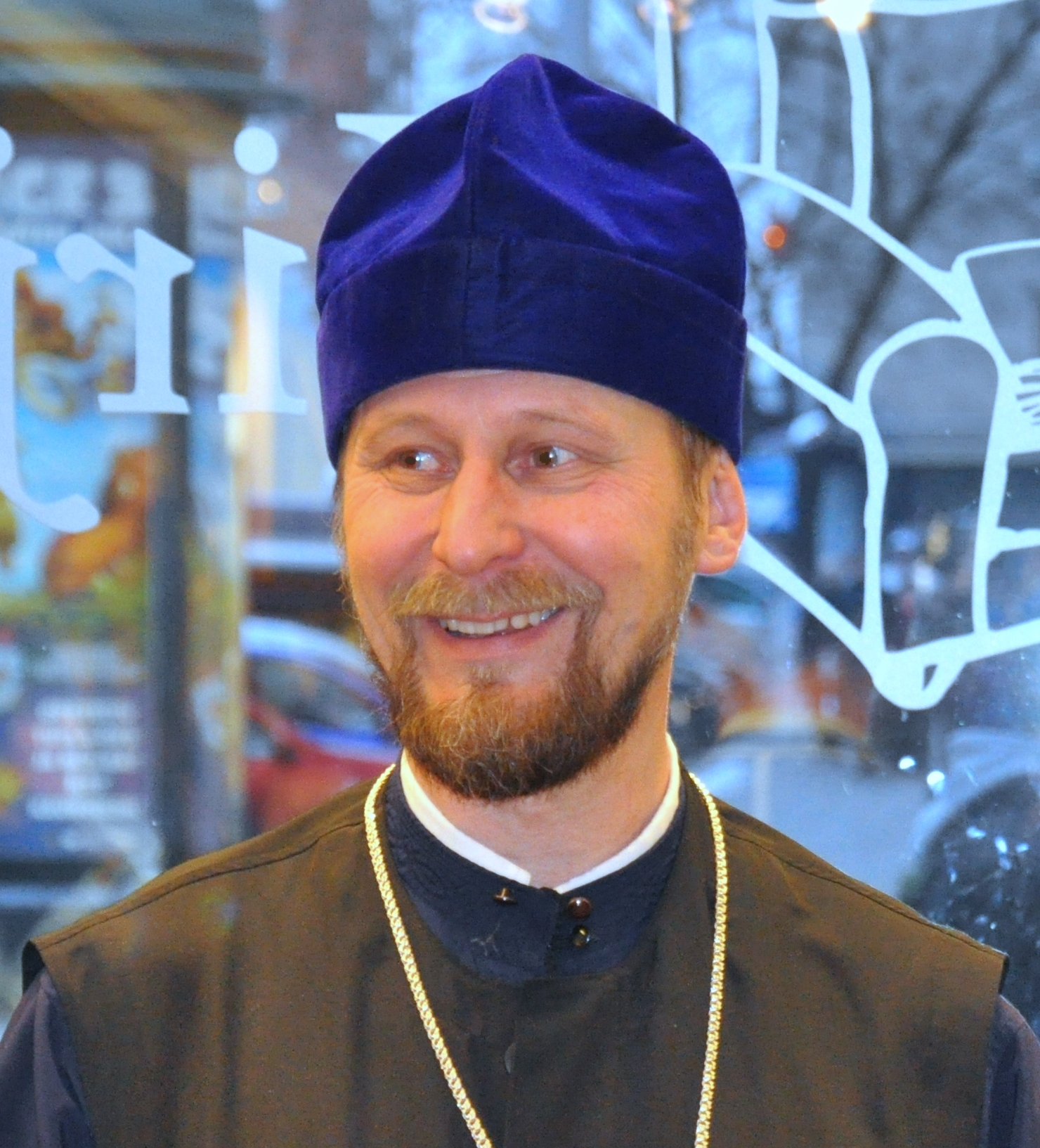
- Arseni in 2009
- Native name: Arseni Heikkinen
- Church: Orthodox Church of Finland
- Appointed: 2018
- Predecessor: Leo (Makkonen) as Archbishop of Karelia and All Finland
- Previous post: Bishop of Joensuu (2005-2018)

Orders
- Ordination: 1986 by Paavali (Olmari)
- Consecration: 23 January 2005 by Leo (Makkonen)

Personal details
- Born: Jorma Heikkinen; 14 July 1957 (age 69) Lapinlahti, Finland
- Denomination: Eastern Orthodox Christianity
- Education: Leningrad Spiritual Academy

Metropolitan Arseni (Secular name: Jorma Heikkinen) (b. July 14, 1957, Lapinlahti, Finland) is a bishop of the Finnish Orthodox Church and an icon painter. Since 2018, he has been metropolitan of the Diocese of Kuopio and Karelia. Previously, he was an assistant bishop of the Finnish Orthodox Church.
