= Ambrosius Jääskeläinen =

Finnish priest

His Eminence Ambrosius
- Metropolitan of Helsinki
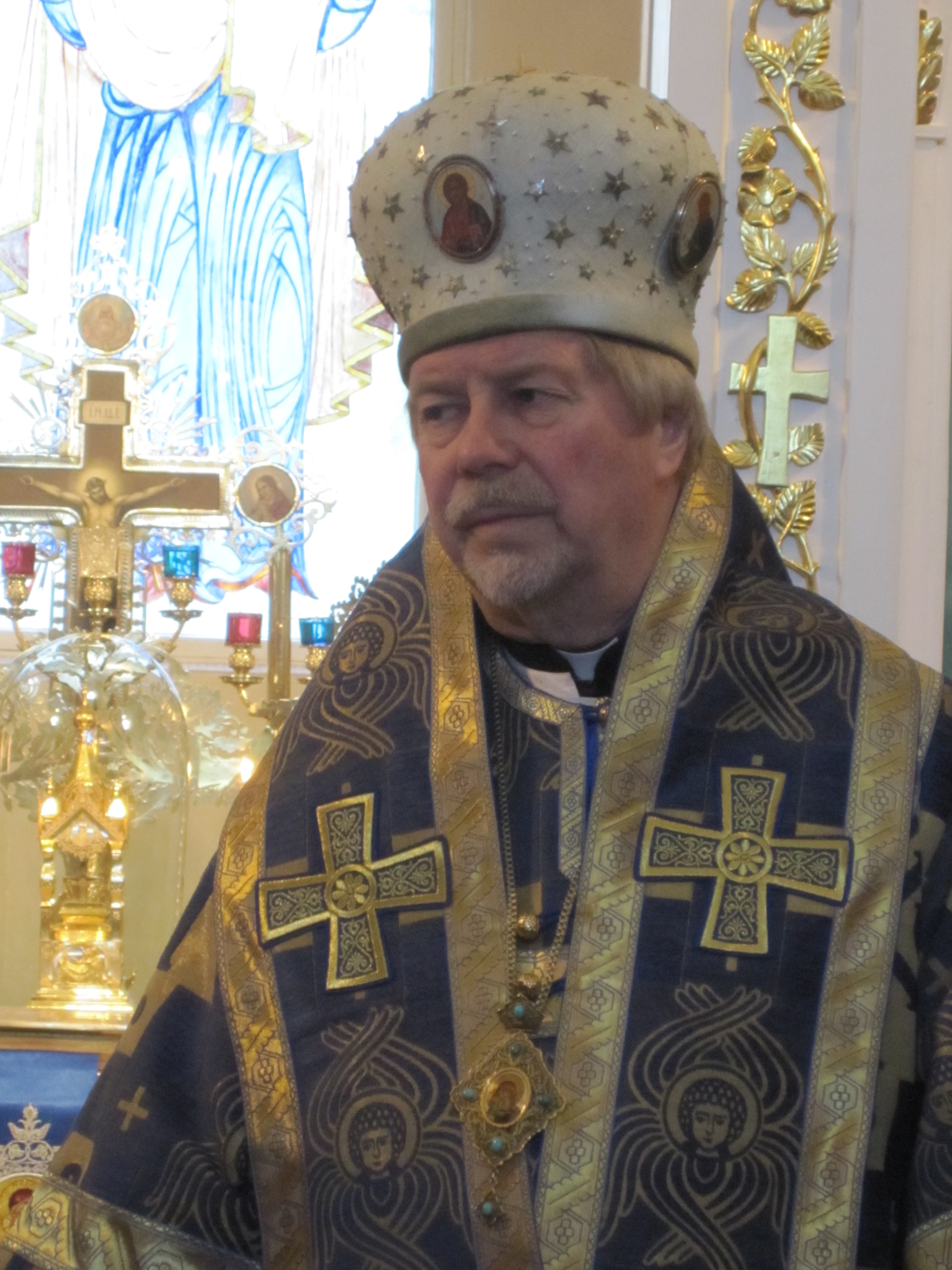
- Ambrosius in 2011
- Native name: Ambrosius Jääskeläinen
- Church: Orthodox Church of Finland
- Appointed: 2002
- Term ended: 2018
- Predecessor: Leo (Makkonen)
- Successor: Leo (Makkonen) as Archbishop of Helsinki and All Finland
- Previous post: Bishop of Joensuu (1988–1996) | Metropolitan of Oulu (1996–2002)

Orders
- Ordination: 1979
- Consecration: 1988

Personal details
- Born: Risto Tapani Jääskeläinen; 10 August 1945 (age 81) Tohmajärvi, Finland
- Denomination: Eastern Orthodox Christianity
- Education: Helsinki University

Metropolitan Ambrosius (Secular name: Risto Tapani Jääskeläinen) (b. 10 August 1945, Tohmajärvi, Finland,) is the retired Metropolitan of Helsinki. He matriculated from the Joensuu Lyceum in 1964. He completed the degree of Master of Theology at Helsinki University in 1968. He also completed the degree of Master of Political Science in 1972.

== Career, ordinations and consecrations ==
Risto Jääskeläinen worked as the rector of the Nurmes Evangelical School during 1967–1968 and as a lecturer of the Orthodox Theological Seminary of Finland during 1969–1970. He has been a research fellow in the United States in 1969, in Hungary in 1969–1970, in the United Kingdom during 1971–1975, in the Soviet Union in 1979, and again in the United States during 1986–1987.

He was ordained a Lutheran minister in 1969, but he resigned from Lutheran priesthood in 1975. In 1974 he worked as an acting lecturer in University of Joensuu and during 1975–1976 acting assistant professor in the same university. He was tonsured an Orthodox monk in 1979, and the same year he was ordained a deacon and a hieromonk in the New Valamo Monastery. While still a novice, his name was brother Kristoforos, but as a monk his name became Ambrosius. He was first the treasurer of New Valamo during 1977–1988, and during 1986–1988 also the deputy head of the monastery.

In 1988, Ambrosius was elected Bishop of Joensuu, i.e. a vicar bishop of the Orthodox Church of Finland, and in 1996 he was elected Metropolitan of Oulu, and finally Metropolitan of Helsinki in 2002. He retired from this see at the beginning of 2018.

Ambrosius is also a board member in a company called Tulikivi and the president of the board of Fine, which an organization of the finance sector in Finland. He has cooperated with the freemasons, but he resigned from this organization in the 1980s. The Orthodox canons forbid the Orthodox to belong to secret societies, but according to Ambrosius, this does not concern today's freemasonry.

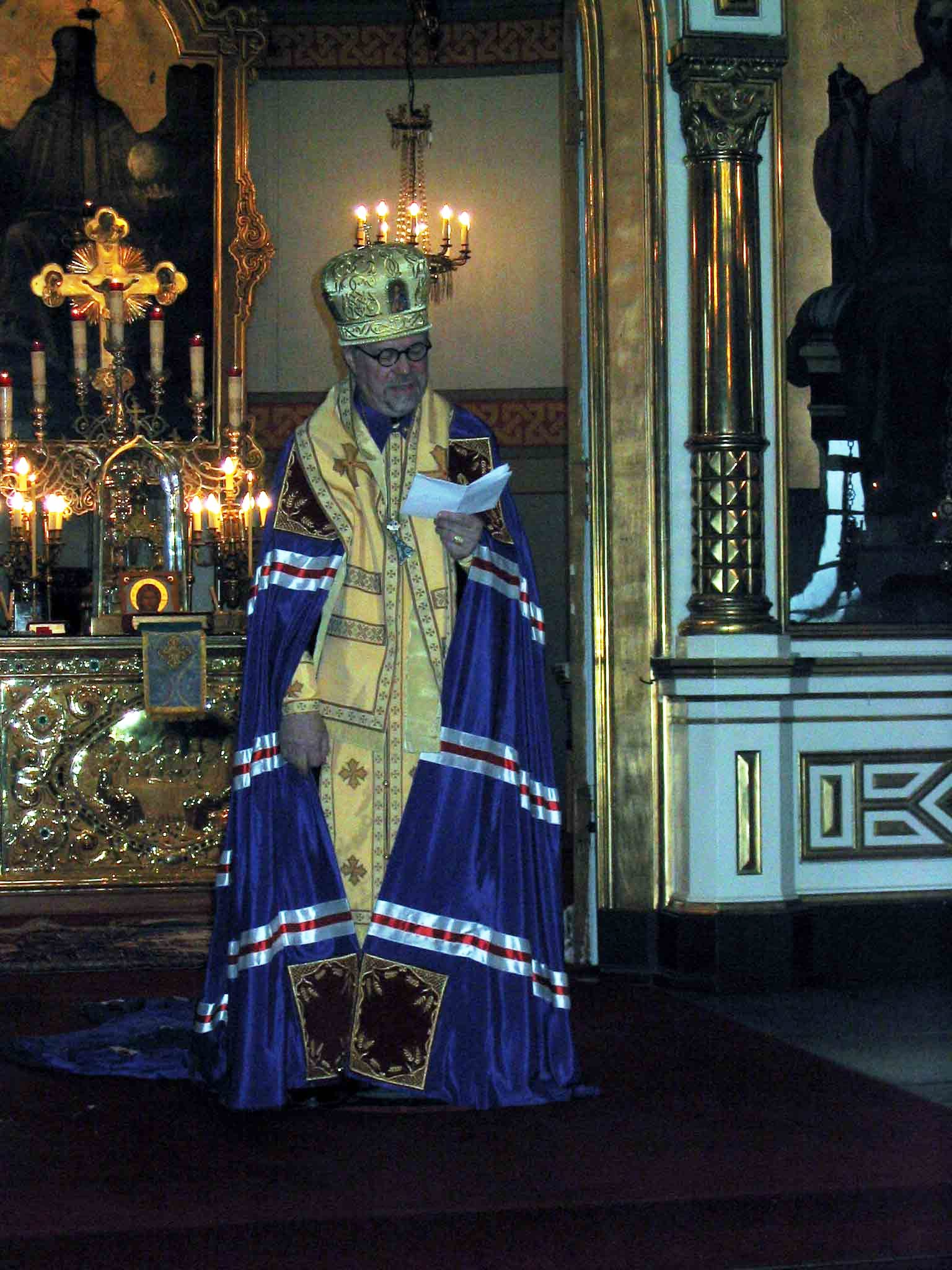
Metropolitan Ambrosius speaking in the Uspenski Cathedral in Helsinki on the Finnish independence day in 2004.

=== Festschrift ===
A book was published in the honour of Ambrosius' 60th birthday in 2005. The writers consisted of his "network", and included e.g. President Tarja Halonen.

=== A woman in the altar controversy in 2015 ===
On the first Sunday of March 2015, Ambrosius ordained new priests in the Uspenski Cathedral in Helsinki. He had invited the Lutheran bishop of Helsinki, Irja Askola to attend the occasion. During the liturgy, Askola had been shown a place on the kliros, near the iconostasis, but during the ordination, which lasted about 10 minutes, Ambrosius invited her into the altar. In addition to this, the deacons read prayers for "Bishop Irja" and "our Bishop Irja".

This caused great controversy, with first Archbishop Leo (Makkonen) and then the retired vicar of the Helsinki Orthodox Parish, Father Veikko Purmonen criticized the act. According to the archbishop, the presence of a woman in the altar and the prayers of the deacons were "against the liturgical order of the Orthodox church." The archbishop also considered that "the members of our church are first and foremost Orthodox, and only secondarily Finns. This is also the starting point of ecumenism. In the Orthodox Church, critical review of the tradition is practiced outside the holy space."

Purmonen wrote that the "incident in the Uspensky Cathedral was not about openness but about something altogether different. The boundaries of what is traditionally accepted were crossed. … I understand completely the deep shock and the strong protests of the church goers, when they were forced to watch an ecumenical play, for which they had not been prepared at all." Purmonen went on to say that "even in elementary school all Orthodox children are taught that according to the canons, only those who have a task there can enter the altar. Women are unequivocally forbidden to go there."

Father Heikki Huttunen and Metropolitan Ambrosius wrote replies to Leo and Purmonen. Huttunen wrote that "for the Orthodox, it an important challenge to recognize the holy tradition from the ornamental tradition, and to be able to separate it from the weight of various historical eras. One area of life that the Orthodox theologians have discussed for a long time is the position of the woman in the church. The Orthodox faith does not teach that women are ritually impure in a way that would dictate that women cannot enter holy spaces. Such a belief may exist on the fringes of the life of the church, but it is not part of the Gospel that the church ought to proclaim."

According to Ambrosius, he had made "a beautiful ecumenical gesture ... We were thankful that a Lutheran bishop wanted to see the event and learn about it and to experience the ordination in our church. After all, this is something that is in the core of the spiritual life of our church.”

He commented on the principles surrounding this controversy as follows: “Our synod reminded us about the sanctity of the altar in 2001: the altar is a holy place. No one has the right to go there, neither man or woman, unless he or she has a special blessing for it or some task to perform there. This rule therefore applies to men and women alike. As far as it is known, no canon forbids women to enter the altar. … It is a special challenge for a minority church to grow away from such inwardly oriented and excessively emphasized pride. And as we represent an unbroken chain of faith, ever since early Christianity, the value of this tradition is tested by our readiness to share its treasures with other Christians.”

The controversy went on, when Archbishop Leo wrote about it to Patriarch Bartholomew I of Constantinople. The Holy Synod of the Ecumenical Patriarchate then wrote to Ambrosius e.g. the following:

It is not only not recommended that outsiders enter the altar, it is clearly forbidden. According to the canonical tradition and the order of the church, women are forbidden to enter the altar. The only exception to this are nuns, who can go to the altar to take candles and chandeliers there and decorate and clean the altar. – –

The entering of a heterodox Lutheran female bishop into the altar, and her presence there during the liturgy, even as an onlooker, is against the canons and something that is not correct. – –

The mother church of Constantinople is bewildered and surprised, and we the members of the Holy Synod are saddened and sorrowful because of your actions. We know the reasons for which 'we do not want to excommunicate those who have caused the scandal', but instead we encourage all Pastors of the Church to 'be continually awake, according to their calling'. We thus consider it our duty to remind you of these canonical and church principles and to state, that both I, the patriarch, and the Holy Synod reprimand you and consider your actions to be offensive and as causing confusion. They have caused widespread confusion in the whole Orthodox church and caused many people to contact the Patriarchate. – –

We remind you and urge you to pay attention to the fact that – as a bishop who belongs to the Ecumenical Patriarchate – you should behave as an Orthodox bishop should, and to keep those promises that you have made when you were consecrated a bishop. We warn you that if similar incidents are repeated, we shall initiate strict canonical processes against you, and we shall mete out the punishments that are ordered by the canons.

Ambrosius commented on the letter from Constantinople as follows:

I consider this to be not a warning but taking of a stand. It is quite clear that the Patriarch of Constantinople lives in a different phase of church development compared to us. People in Eastern Europe have not really learned about ecumenism, because they have lived so long in an Orthodox monoculture.

Ambrosius was of the opinion that he had done nothing untoward by inviting Askola to the altar:

I invited her there myself. She was in the altar room to see how a priest is ordained in our church. She did not participate in the rituals. For me, this is important interaction, and in our Finnish context this something completely normal. – –

This is not a disagreement on the doctrine. This is about the openness of the Orthodox church, about whether we want to live in a ghetto or orient ourselves toward the future. – –

The Orthodox church has a fine relationship with the Lutheran church. It is important to maintain this relationship. – –

One can see a kind of phobia against feminism in the Orthodox world. Women priesthood is something people are afraid of, although this is an open question in the Orthodox church. We have never taken a stand on women priesthood, deciding that it will never happen.

== Works ==
- Pyhyyden kaipaus [Longing for the sacred]. Oulu: Oulun ortodoksisen hiippakunnan säätiö. 1999. ISBN 951-98101-1-0.
- Etsijän mielellä. Arvopohdintoja ajassamme [The mind of the seeker. Values of our times]. Oulu: Oulun ortodoksisen hiippakunnan säätiö. 2001. ISBN 951-98101-3-7.
- Suomessa, Euroopassa ja maailmassa [In Finland, Europe and the world]. Helsinki: Suomen ortodoksisen kulttuurikeskuksen säätiö. 2005. ISBN 952-99462-1-X.

=== Books edited ===
- Valamon juhlakirja ('Festschrift for Valamo'), 1977
- Ortodoksinen kirkko Suomessa ('The Orthodox Church in Finland'), 1979
- Kristinuskon syntysijoilla – Islamin keskellä ('In the birthplace of Christianity – Surrounded by Islam'), 2001
- Henkinen johtajuus ('Psychological leadership'), & Henrikki Tikkanen, Timo Kietäväinen, 2009

== Awards and recognitions ==
- Finnish State Award from the Committee for Public Information, 1980
- Kuopio city award for promoting culture, 1996
- The title of an archimandrite, 1986
- Commander of the Order of the White Rose of Finland
- Commander of the Order of the Holy Lamb of the Finnish Orthodox Church
- Commander of the Order of the Phoenix of Greece, 1st class
- Commander of the Order of the Cross of Terra Mariana (3rd class)
- Order of St. Plato of Estonian Apostolic Orthodox Church, 3rd class
- Order of St. Plato of Estonian Apostolic Orthodox Church, 2nd class, 2017

== See also ==
- Orthodoxy
- Metropolitan bishop
- Uspenski Cathedral, Helsinki
