= Uspenski Cathedral =

Cathedral in Helsinki, Finland

- Finnish: Uspenskin katedraali Swedish: Uspenskijkatedralen
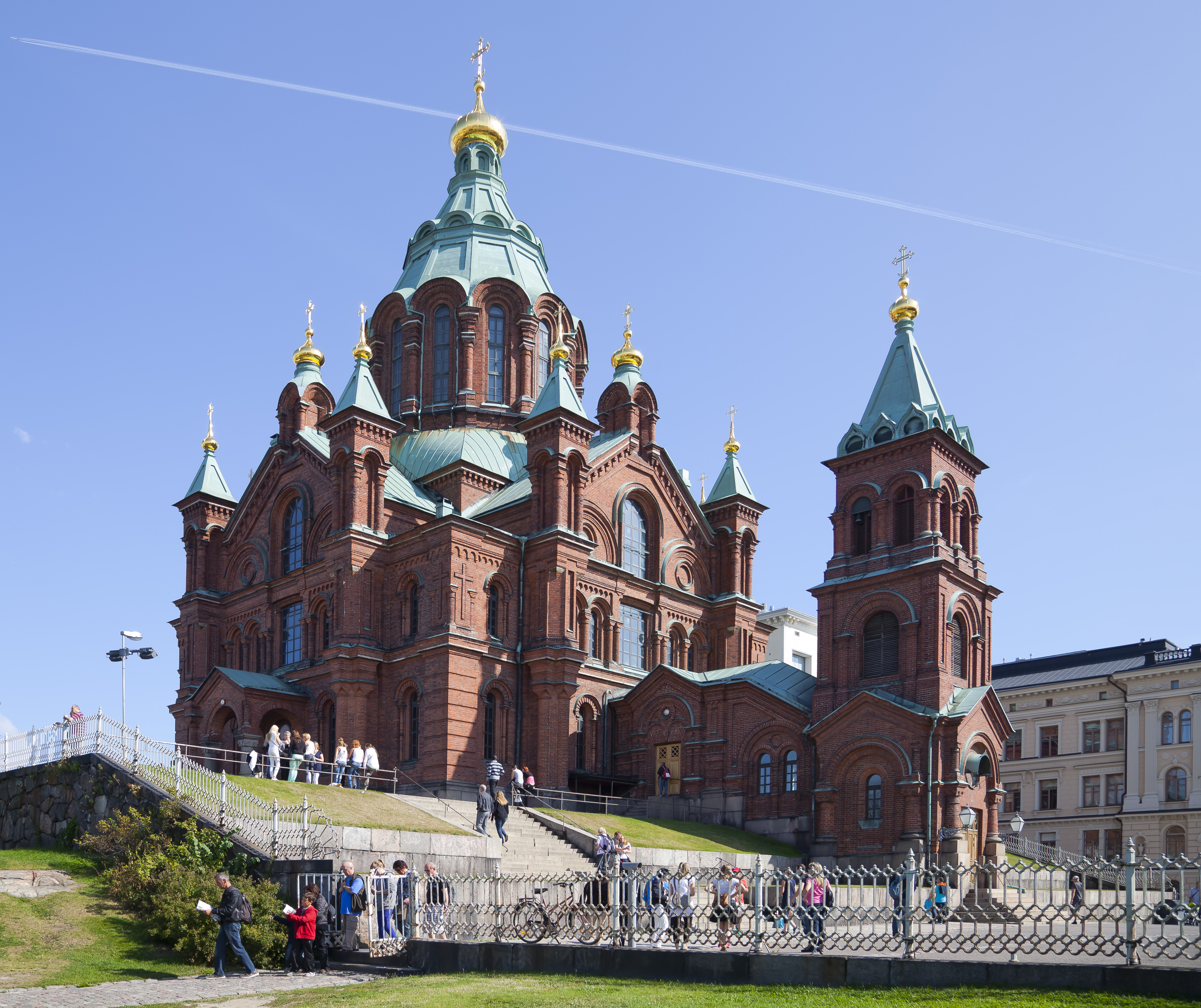
- Uspenski Cathedral
- 60°10′06″N 024°57′36″E
- Location: Helsinki
- Country: Finland
- Denomination: Eastern Orthodox
- Website: hos.fi/uspenskin-katedraali (in Finnish)

History
- Dedication: Dormition of Virgin Mary
- Consecrated: 1868

Architecture
- Functional status: Active
- Architect: Aleksey Gornostayev
- Architectural type: Cathedral
- Style: Russian Revival architecture

Administration
- Archdiocese: Helsinki

Clergy
- Archbishop: Elia (Wallgrén)
- Dean: Markku Salminen

Uspenski Cathedral (Finnish: Uspenskin katedraali, Swedish: Uspenskijkatedralen) is a Greek Orthodox or Eastern Orthodox cathedral in Helsinki, Finland, and main cathedral of the Orthodox Church of Finland, dedicated to the Dormition of the Theotokos (the Virgin Mary). Its name comes from the Old Church Slavonic word uspenie, which denotes the Dormition. It is the largest Orthodox church in Northern Europe.

== Description ==
After Helsinki was made into the capital of Finland in 1812, Alexander I decreed in 1814 that 15 percent of the salt import tax were to be collected into a fund for two churches, one Lutheran and one Orthodox. Helsinki's Orthodox Church, considered to have formed in 1827 with the construction of the Holy Trinity Church, Helsinki, was in need of a larger church than before for a growing Orthodox parish. The construction of Uspenski Cathedral was largely funded by parishioners and private donors.

The cathedral was designed by the Russian architect Aleksey Gornostayev (1808–1862). The cathedral was built after his death in 1862–1868 and the work was led by architect Ivan Varnek. It was inaugurated on 25 October 1868. Used in construction of the cathedral, 700,000 bricks were brought over in barges from the Bomarsund Fortress that had been demolished in the Crimean War. The iconostasis is painted by Pavel S. Shiltsov. Based on the wishes of Alexander II, the church was dedicated to the Dormition of the Mother of God (uspenie). Crown Prince Alexander III and Moscow merchants gave significant donations for the construction of the church.

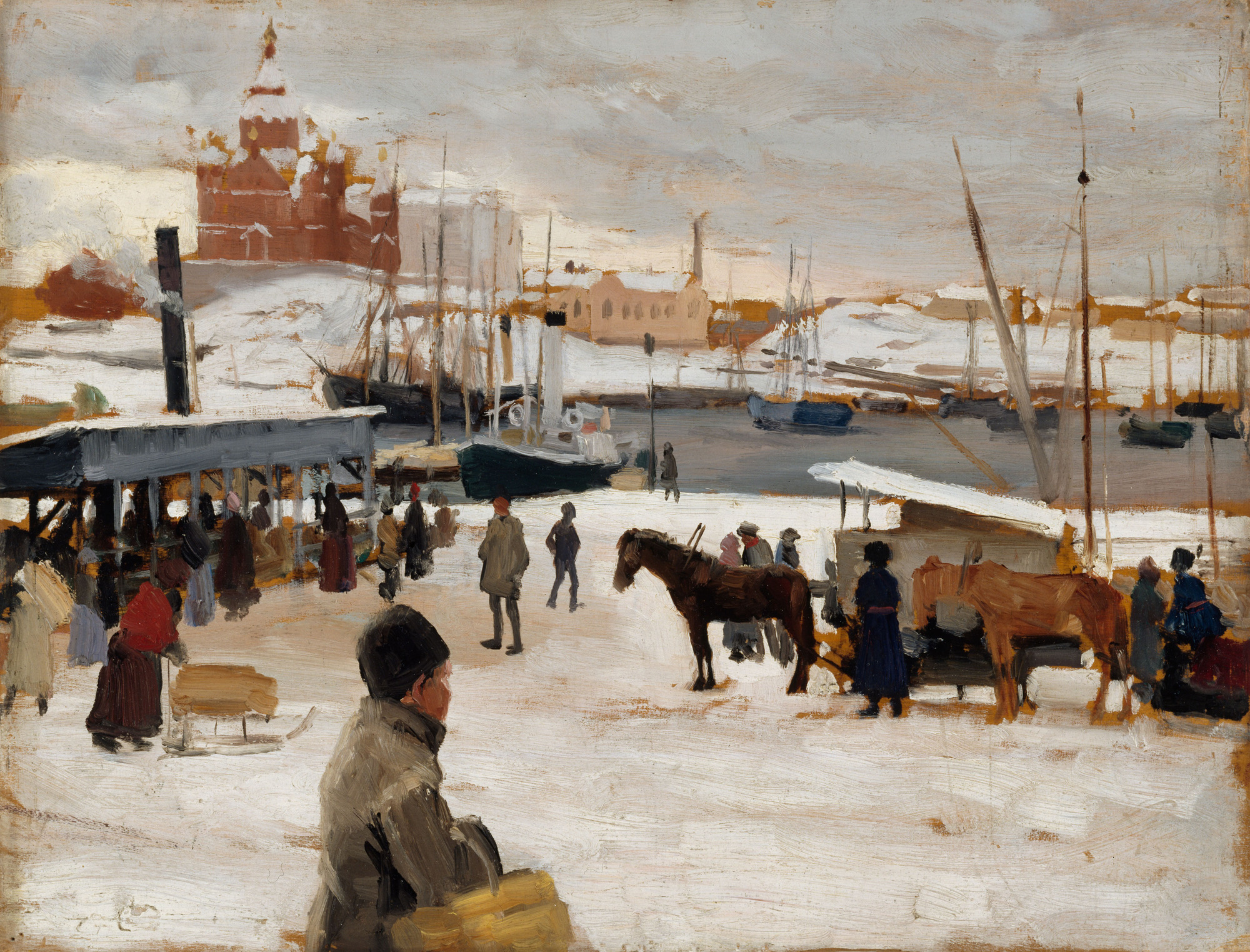
Winter Day at Helsinki Market Square, sketch by Albert Edelfelt in 1889

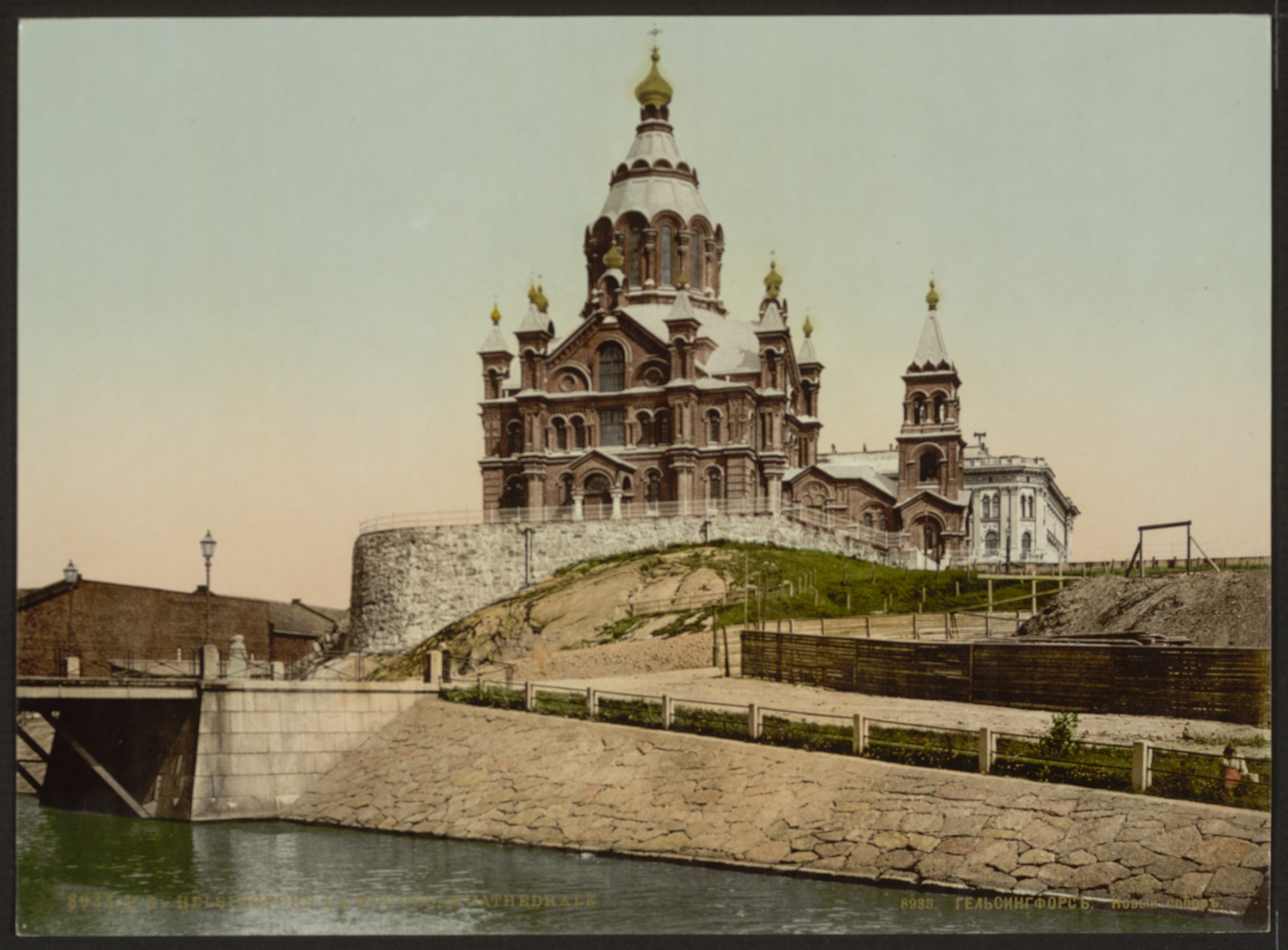
The cathedral in 1890–1900

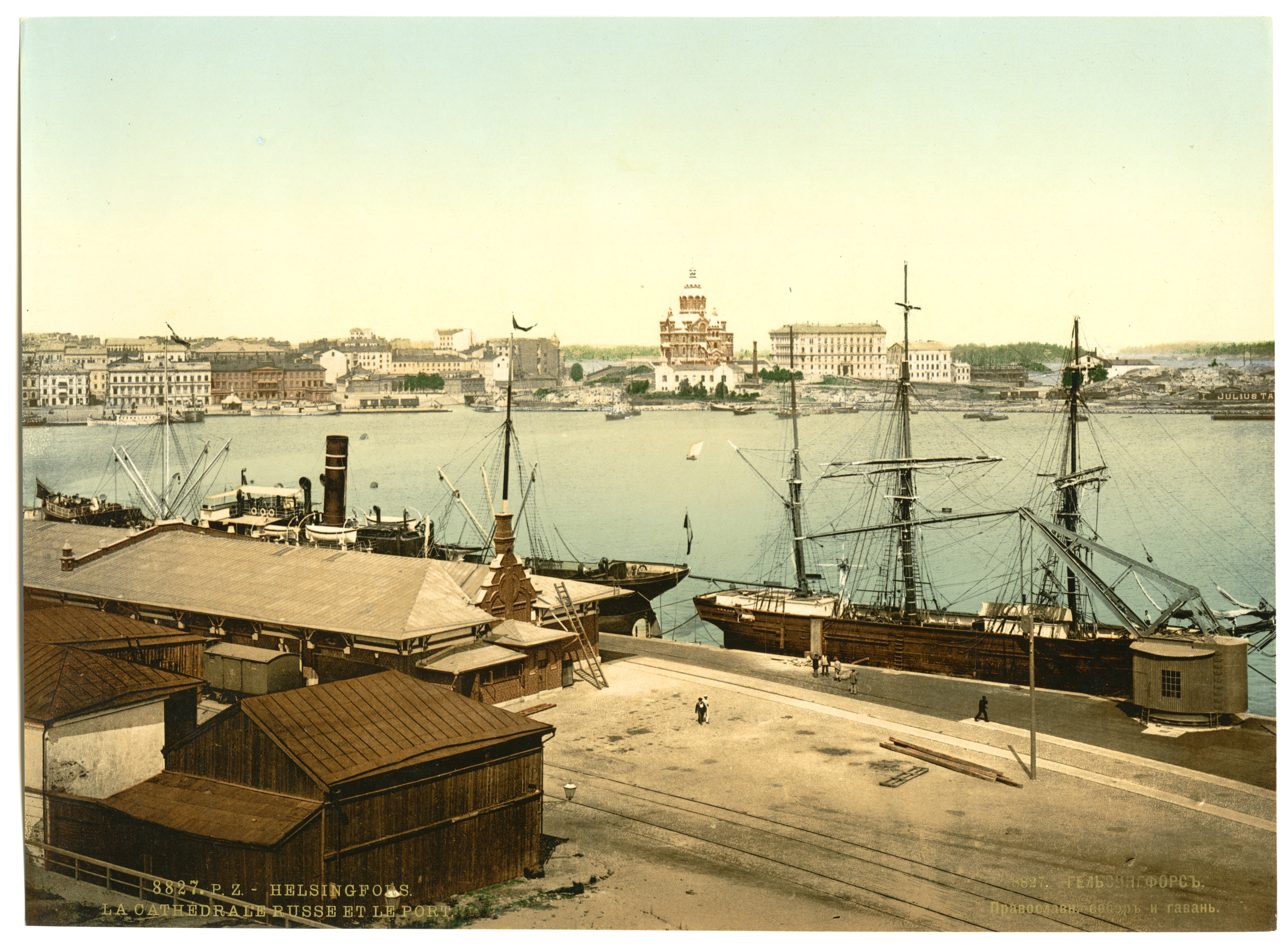
The cathedral and the harbor in 1890–1900

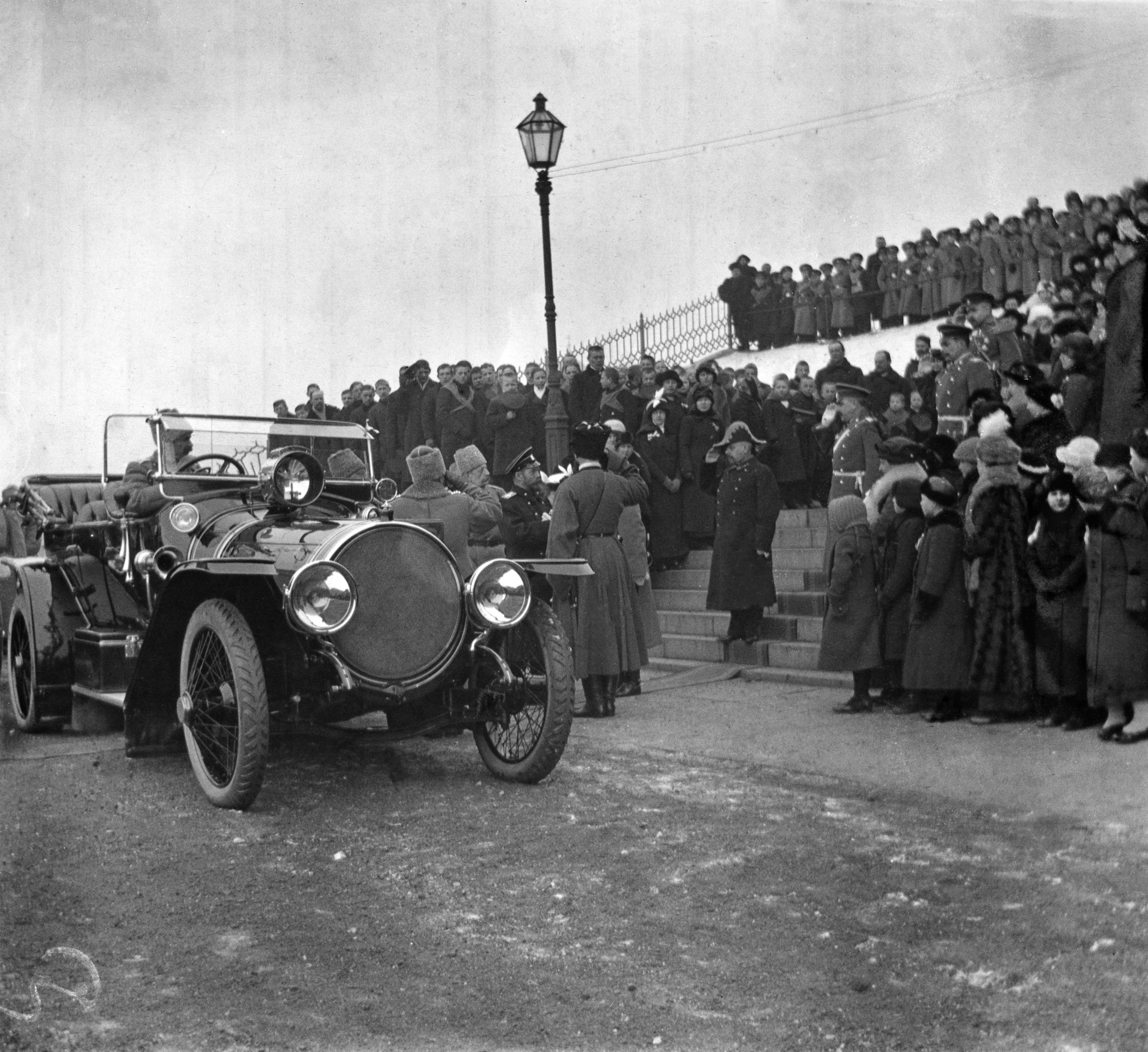
Nicholas II leaving after visiting for a service on 10 March 1915

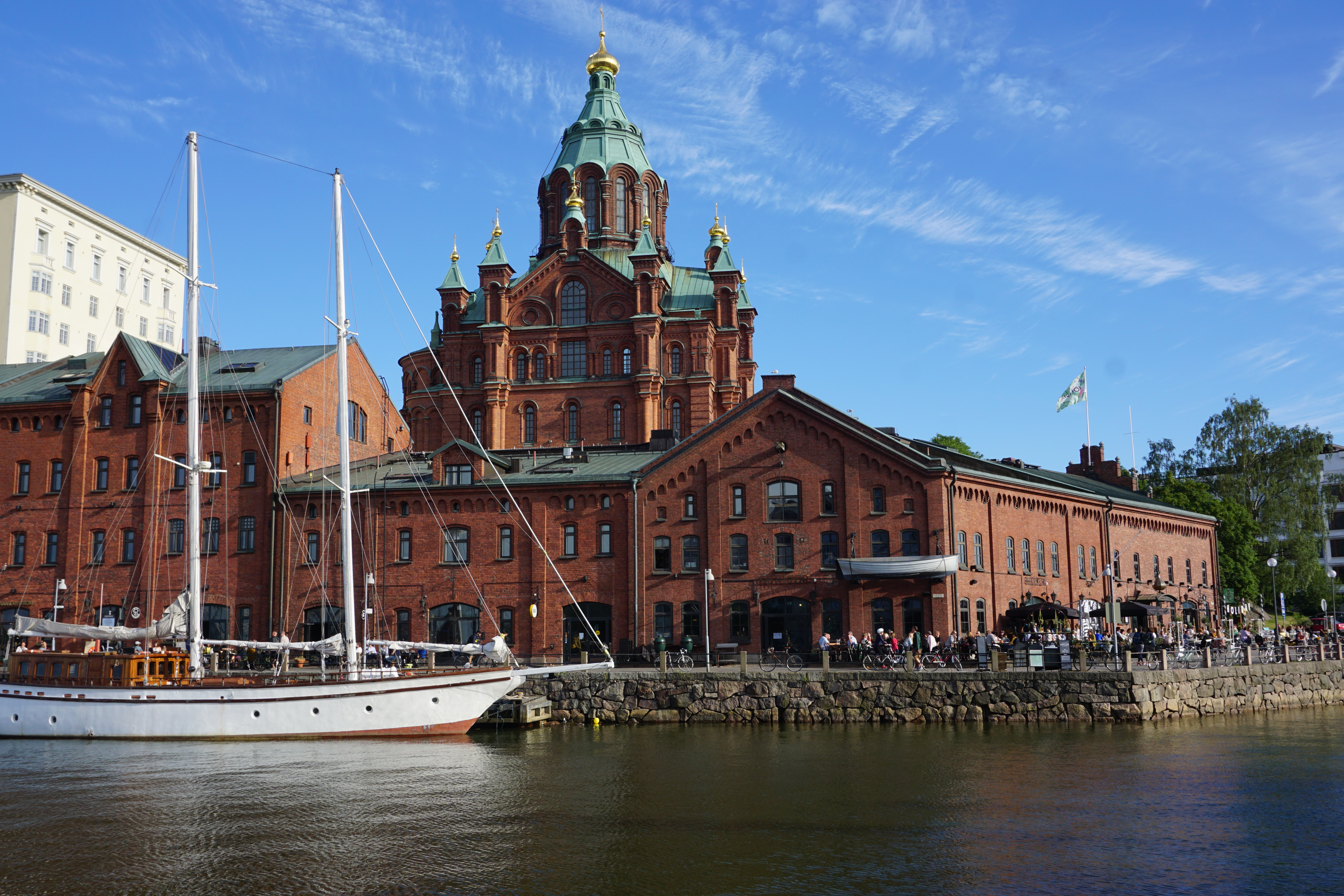
The cathedral during a summer evening in 2018.

The crypt chapel of the cathedral is named after the holy Alexander Hotovitzky, who served as vicar of the Orthodox parish of Helsinki 1914–1917, died a martyr death in the Great Purge and was canonized by the Russian Orthodox Church in 1994.

The cathedral is set upon a hillside on the Katajanokka peninsula overlooking the city. On the back of the cathedral, there is a plaque commemorating Russian Emperor Alexander II, who was the sovereign of the Grand Duchy of Finland during the cathedral's construction. Main cathedral of the Finnish Orthodox Church in the diocese of Helsinki, Uspenski Cathedral is claimed to be the largest orthodox church in Western Europe.

Annually, about half a million tourists visit the church. Admission to the cathedral was for a long time free of charge, but since May 2025 there is an admission fee of 5 euros to adults outside the times of divine services. The acquired funds are directed to restoring the cathedral. The cathedral is closed on Mondays.

== Icon theft ==
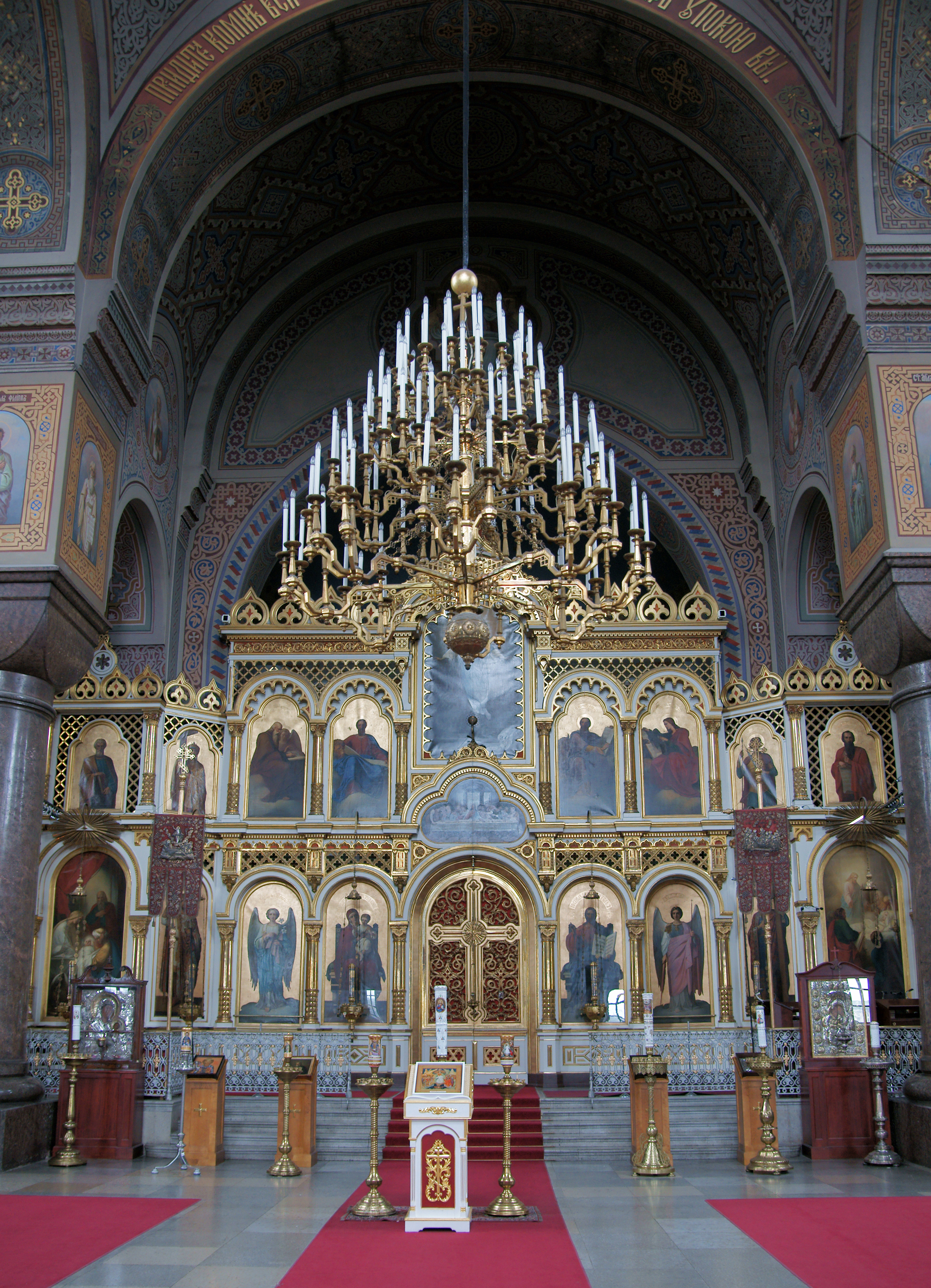
The iconostasis

The cathedral has several valuable icons. The icon of St. Nicolas – The Wonder Worker was stolen on 16 August 2007 between midday and 1 p.m. in broad daylight while hundreds of tourists were visiting the cathedral. The icon is from the 19th century and is of a rare variant. Originally it was given to the Orthodox Cathedral of Vyborg, from where it was moved to Helsinki during the Second World War. No further details of its origin are known. The icon, 45 by 35 centimetres (18 in × 14 in) in size, had been placed in a kiota (a glass covered protection frame) and weighed a couple of kilograms. It was on display on a lectern. The search for the icon continues in Finland as well as abroad.

Another icon, Theotokos of Kozeltshan was stolen in June 2010, but it was later recovered in February 2011 from a hiding spot in the ground. Two robbers had broken into the church twice through a window and on the second time in August they had been caught. Although they did not admit to having committed the first robbery, DNA testing through a blood stain left during the first robbery confirmed it. Nevertheless, the robbers still kept on denying having done it. But in February the next year, one of the jailed robbers had a change of heart and admitted to it all and revealed the location of the icon. It had spent 8 months in the ground but remained nearly immaculate.

== Gallery ==
Exterior details of the cathedral
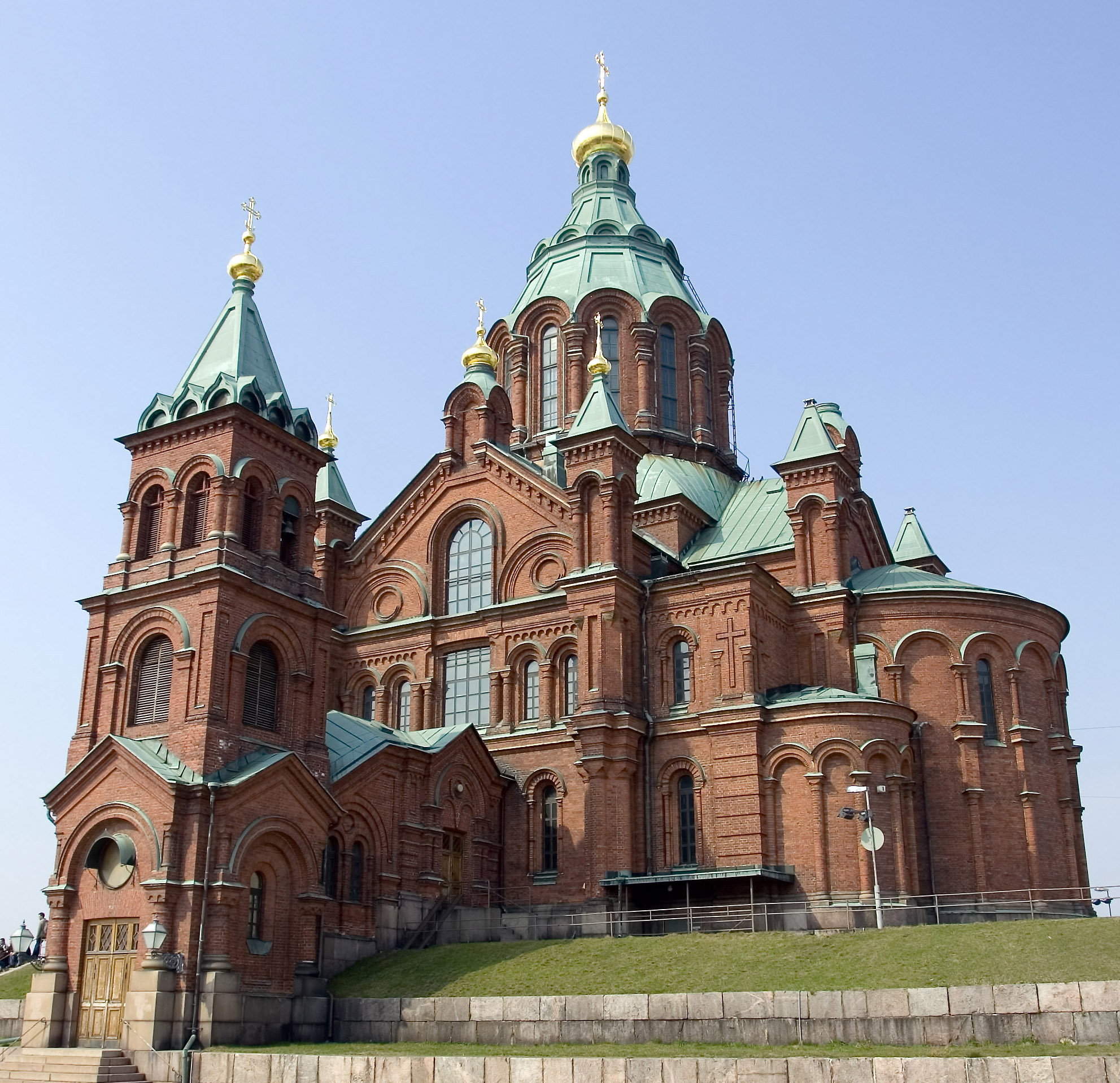
East side of the cathedral

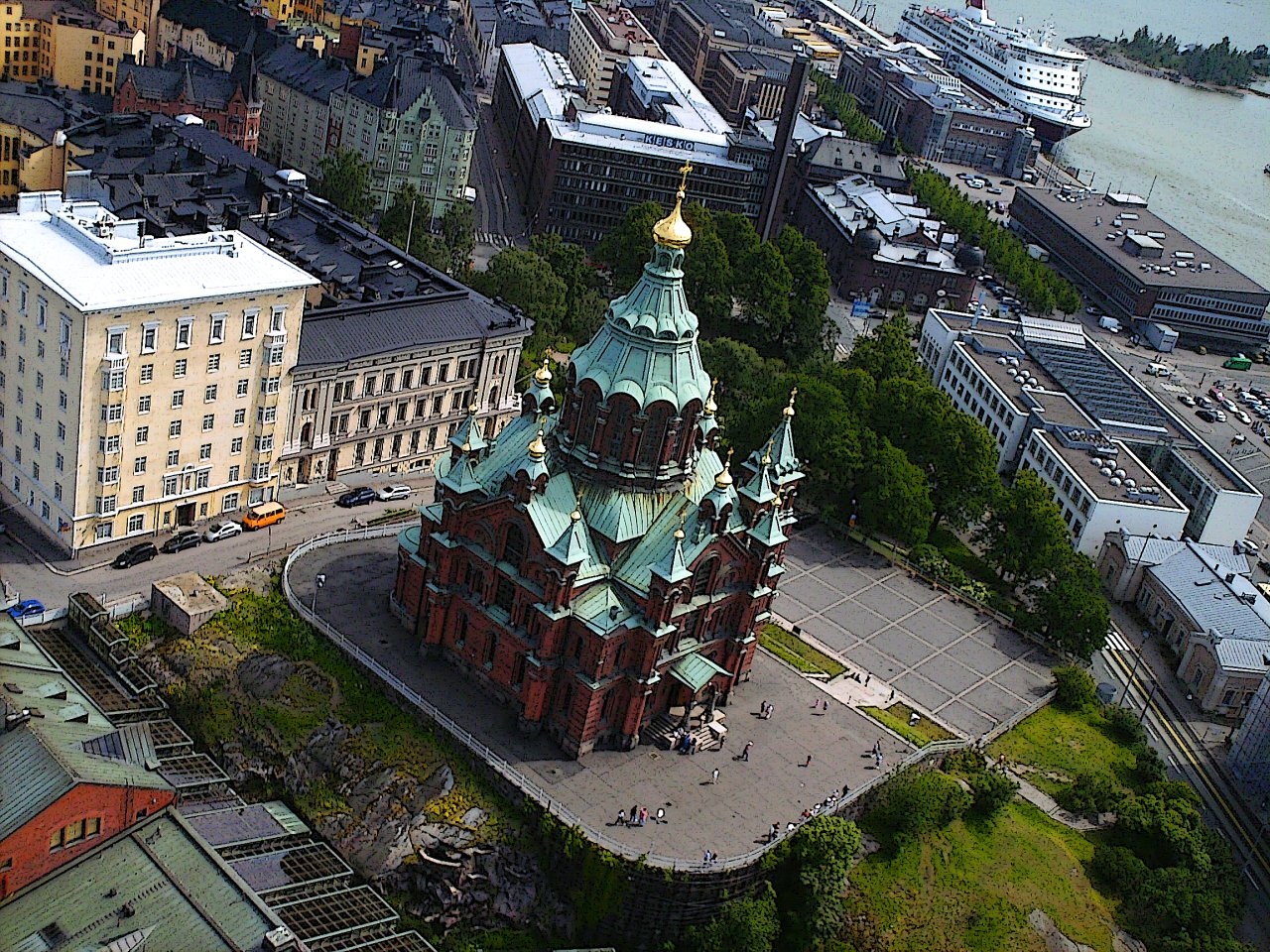
From air

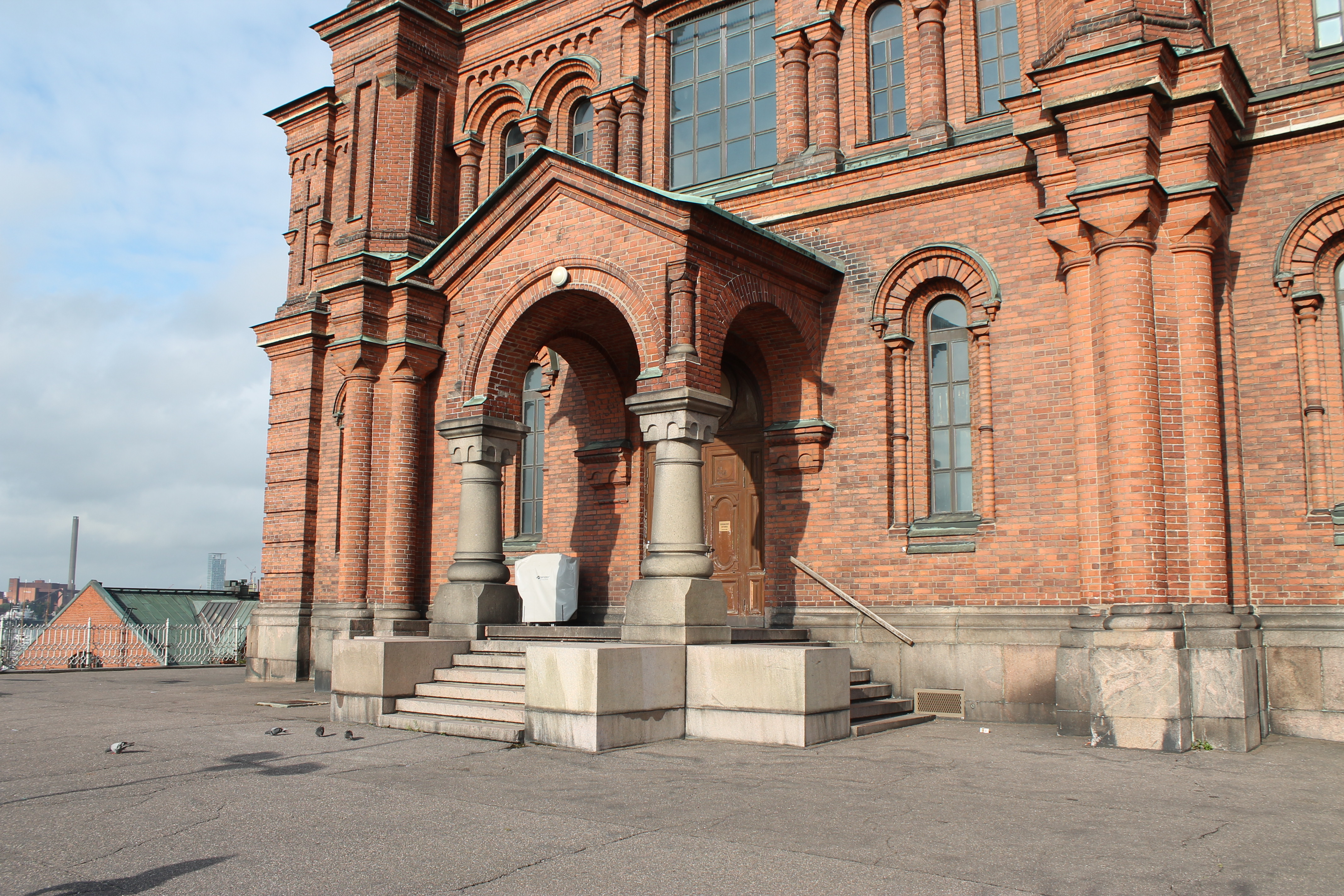
Porch on the west side

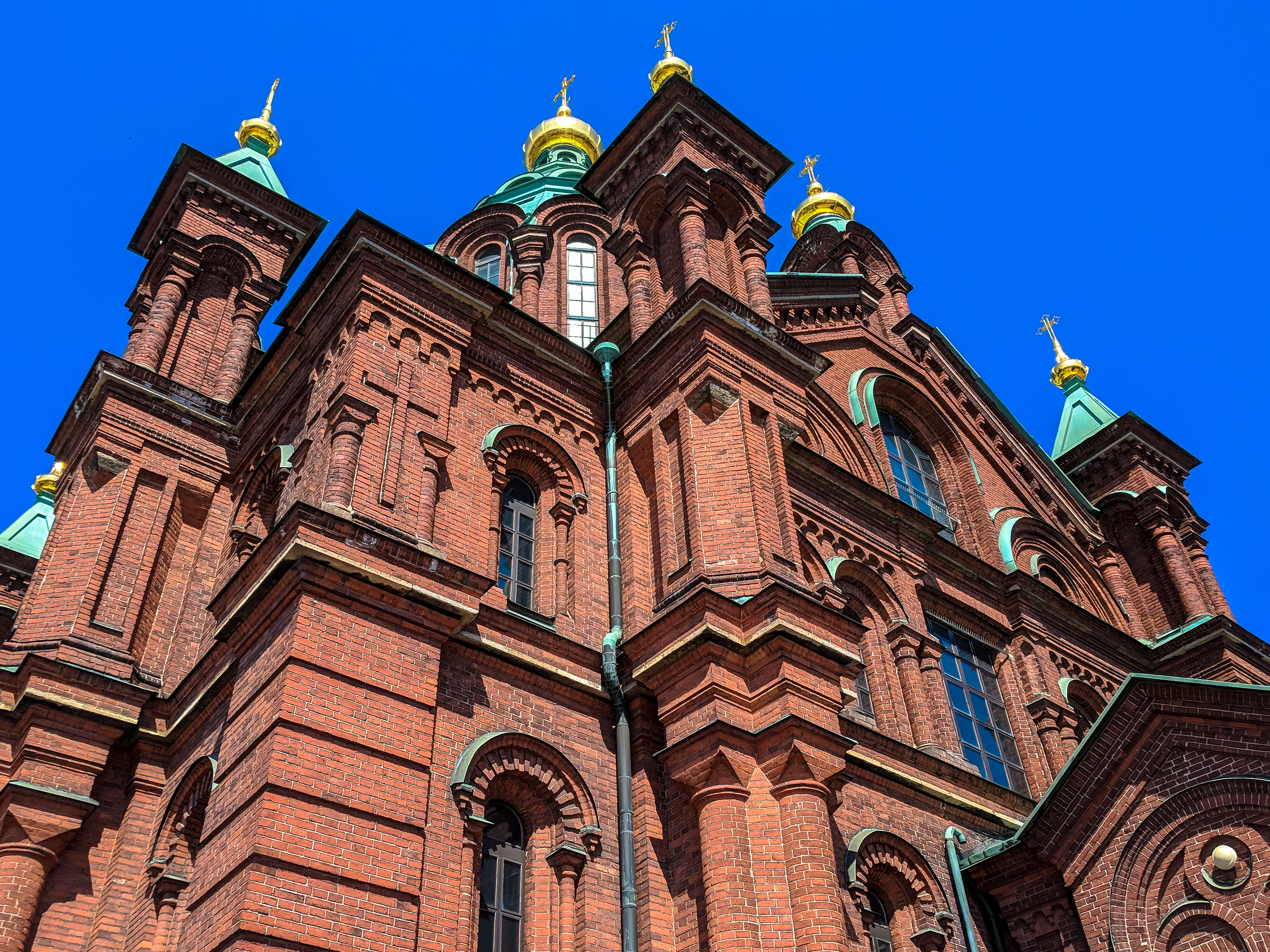
Outer detail

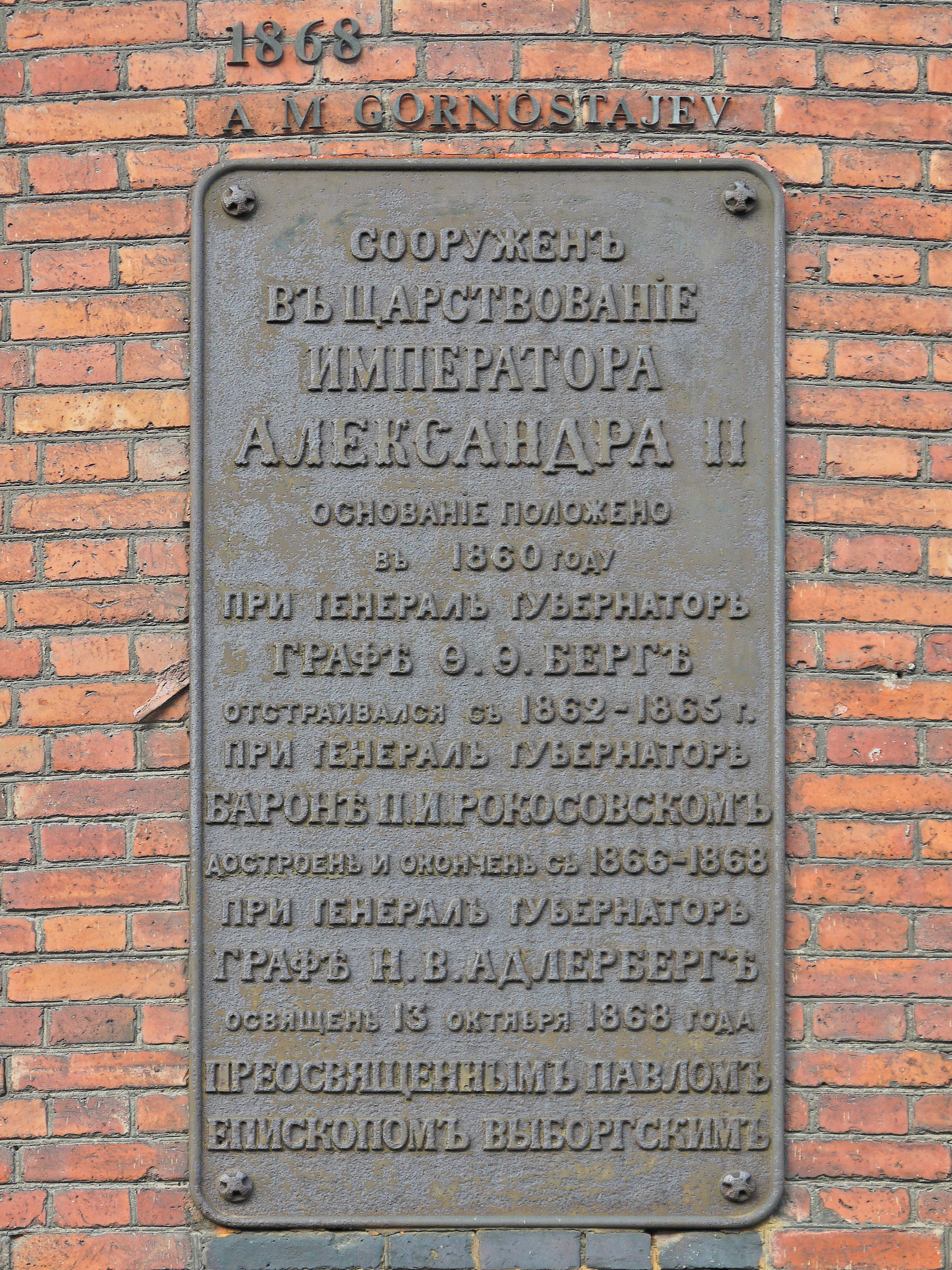
Plaque commemorating Alexander II

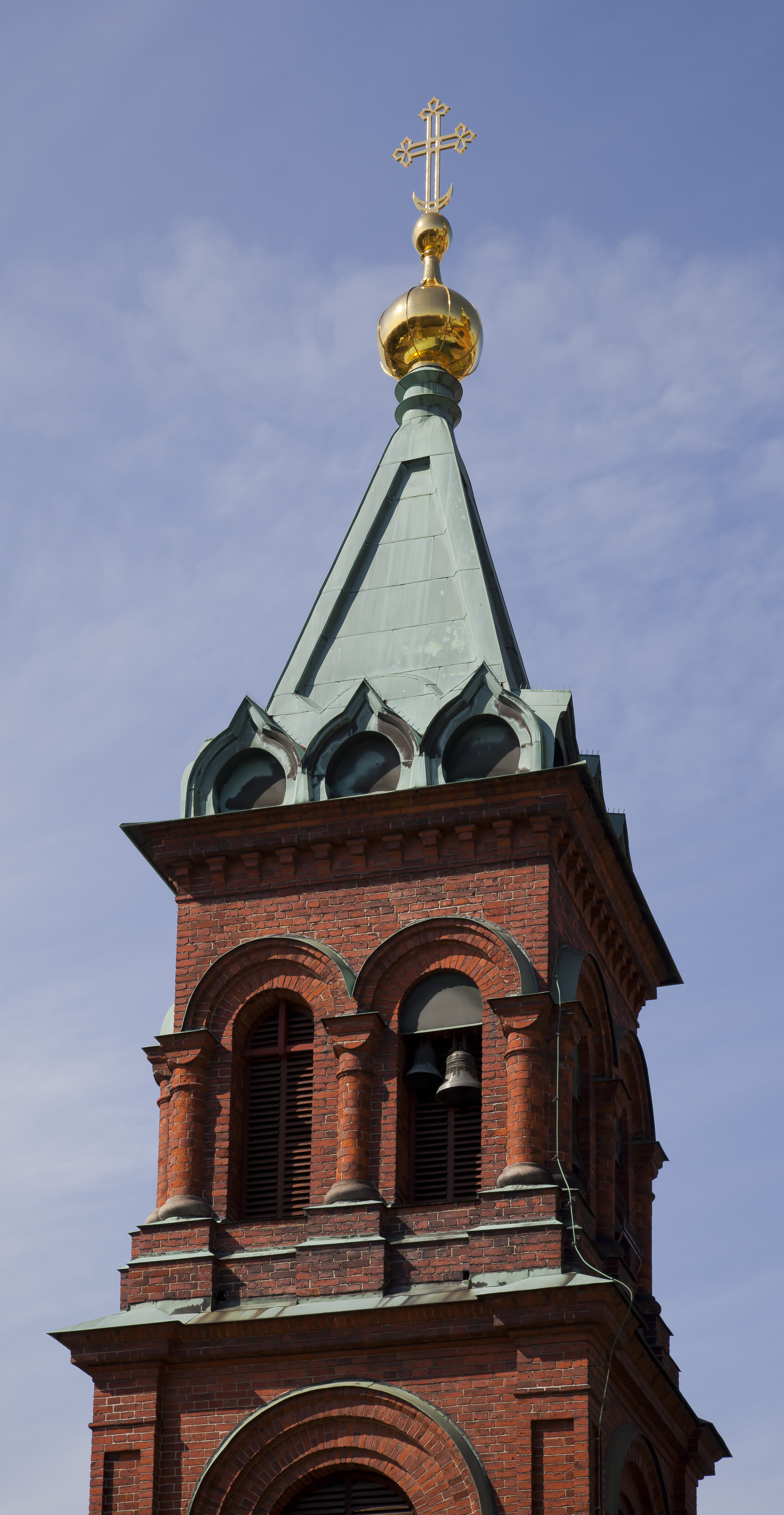
Bell tower

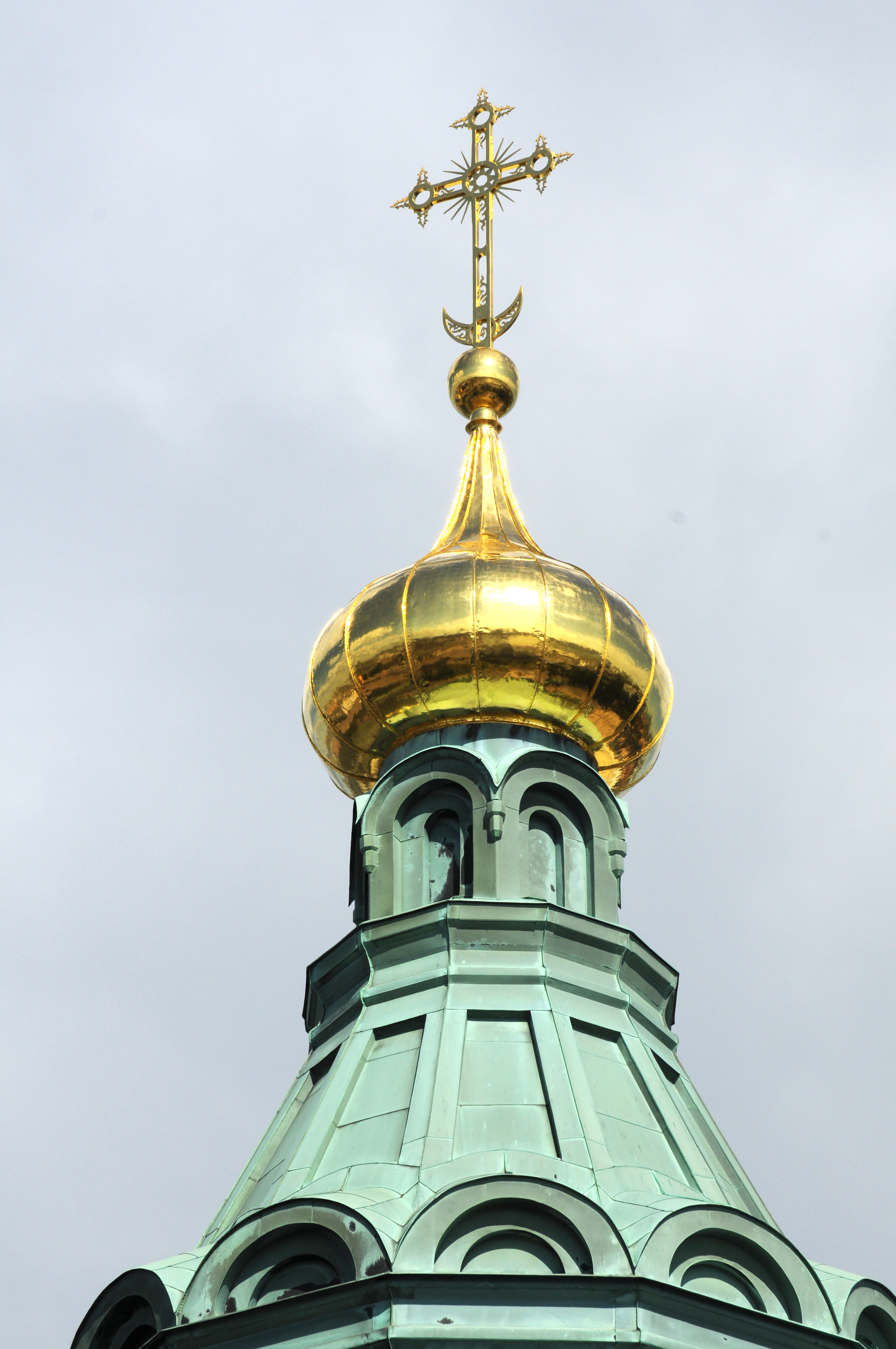
Main dome detail

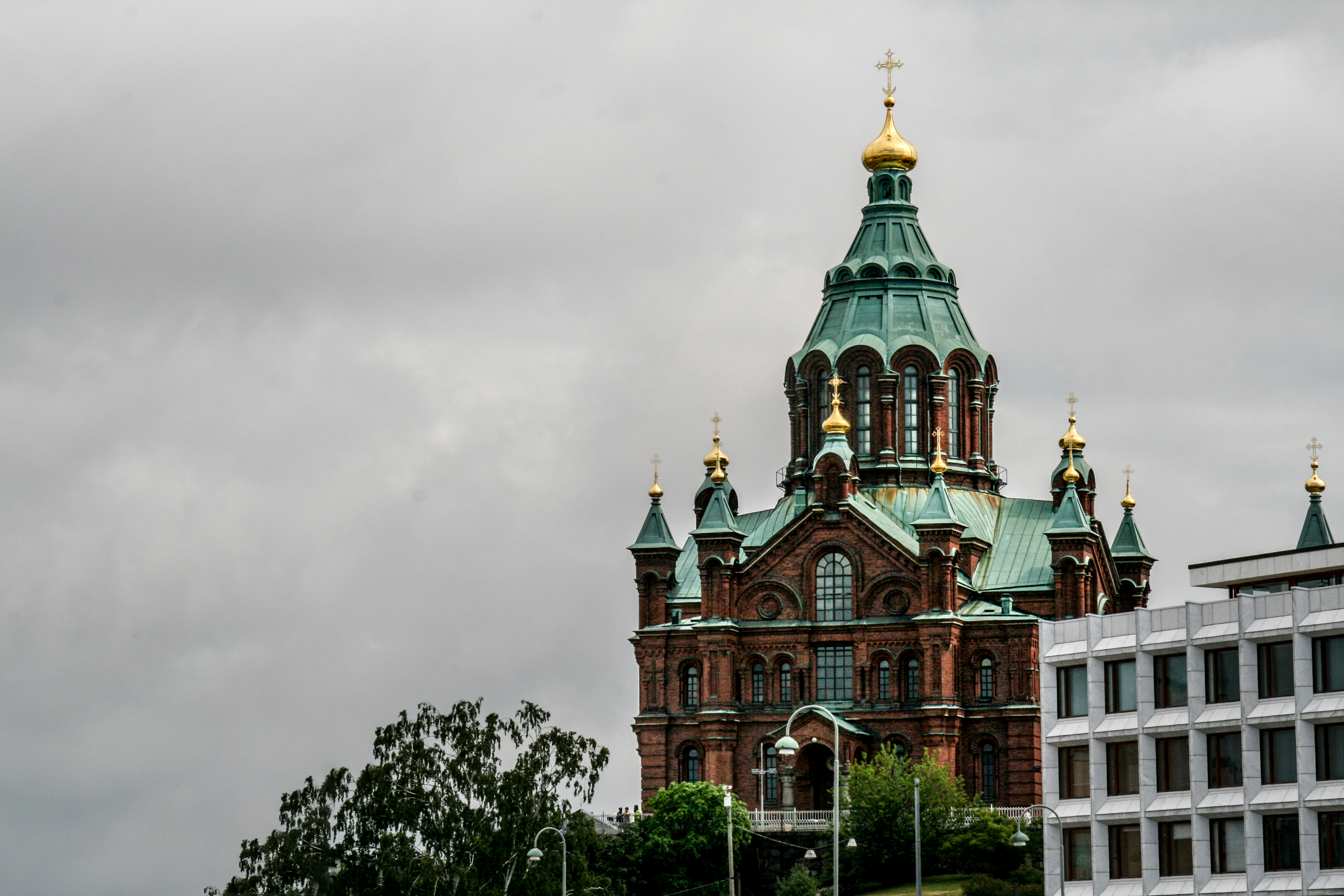
The cathedral and the former HQ of Stora Enso.
Interior
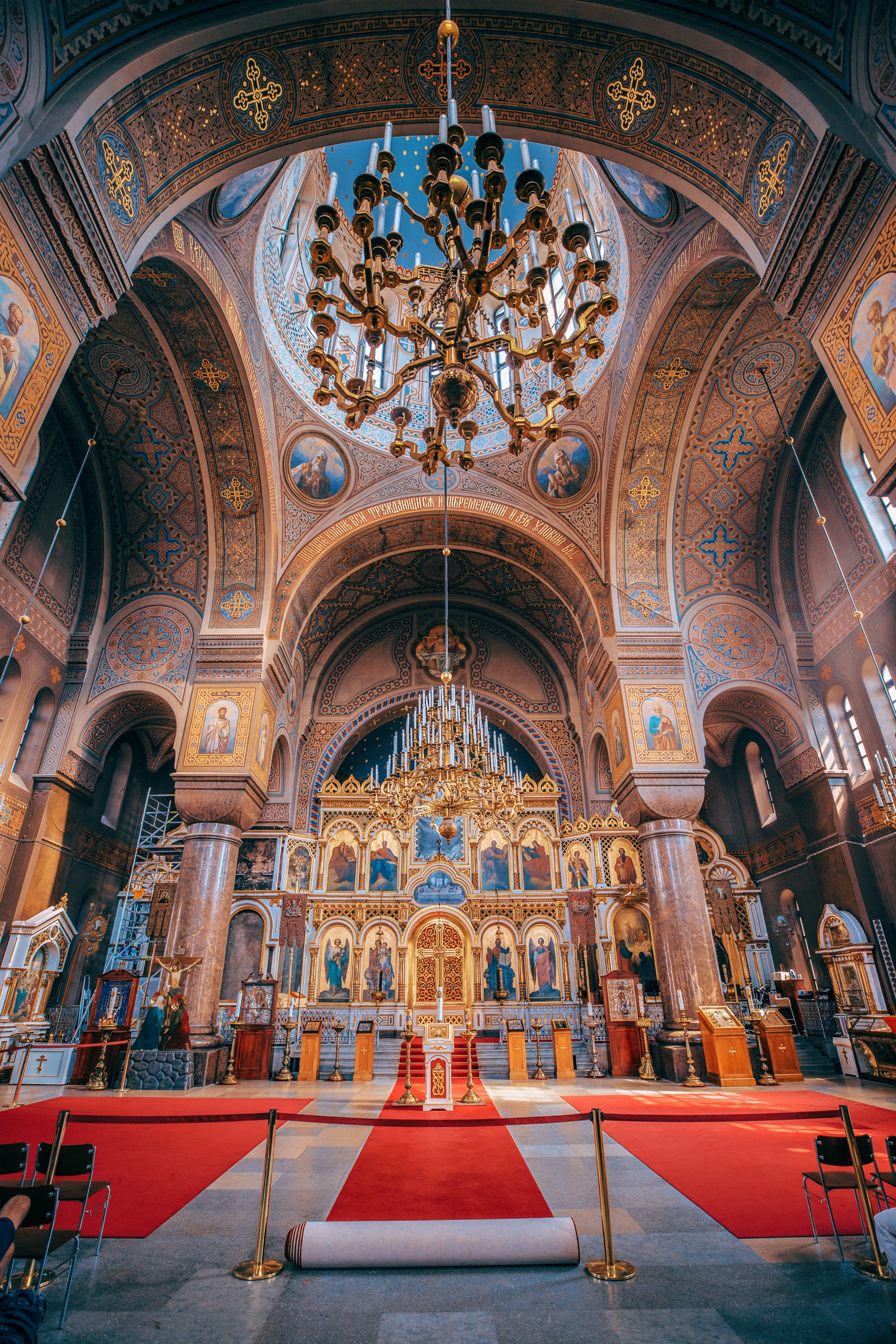
Interior in 2019

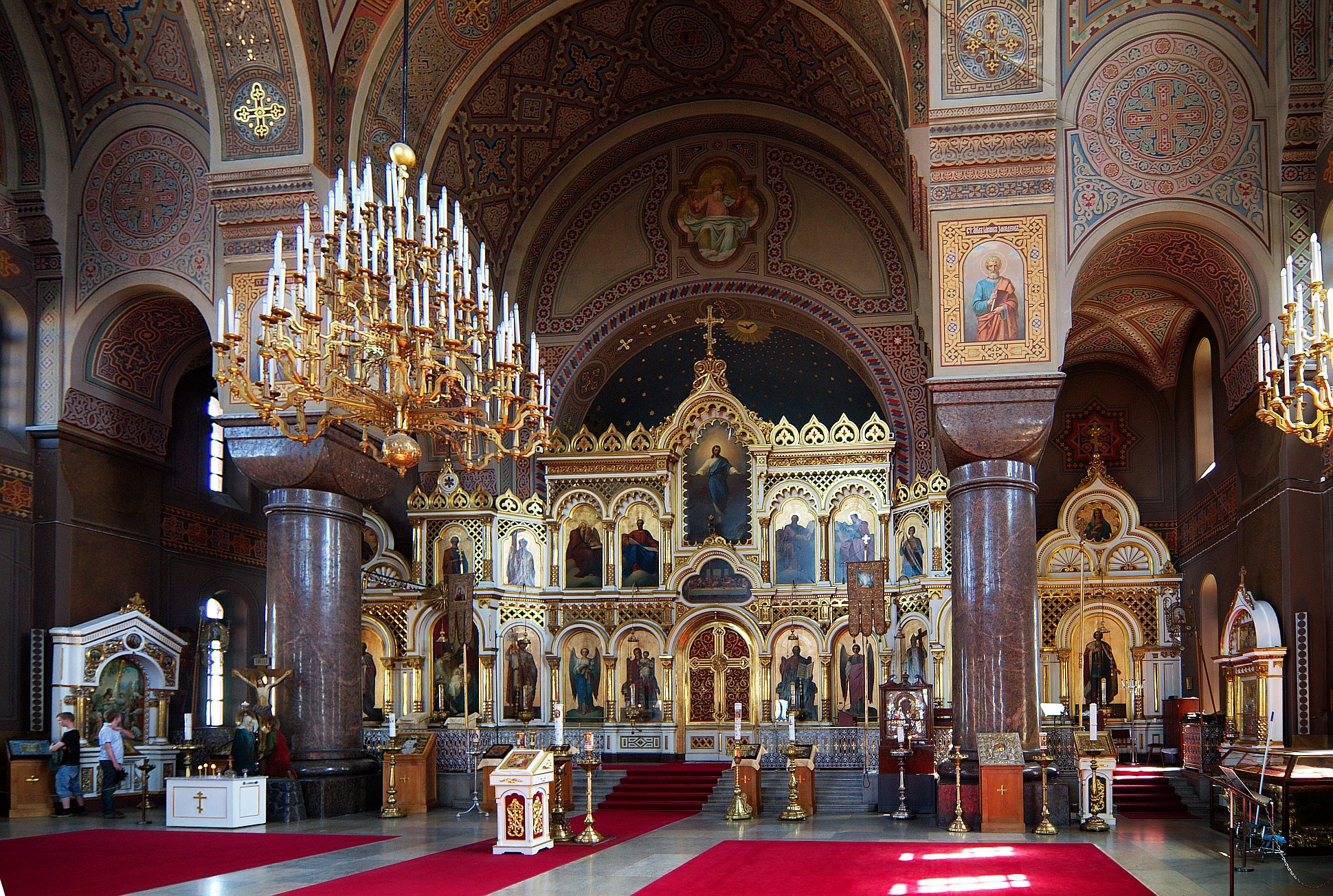
Iconostasis in June 2007

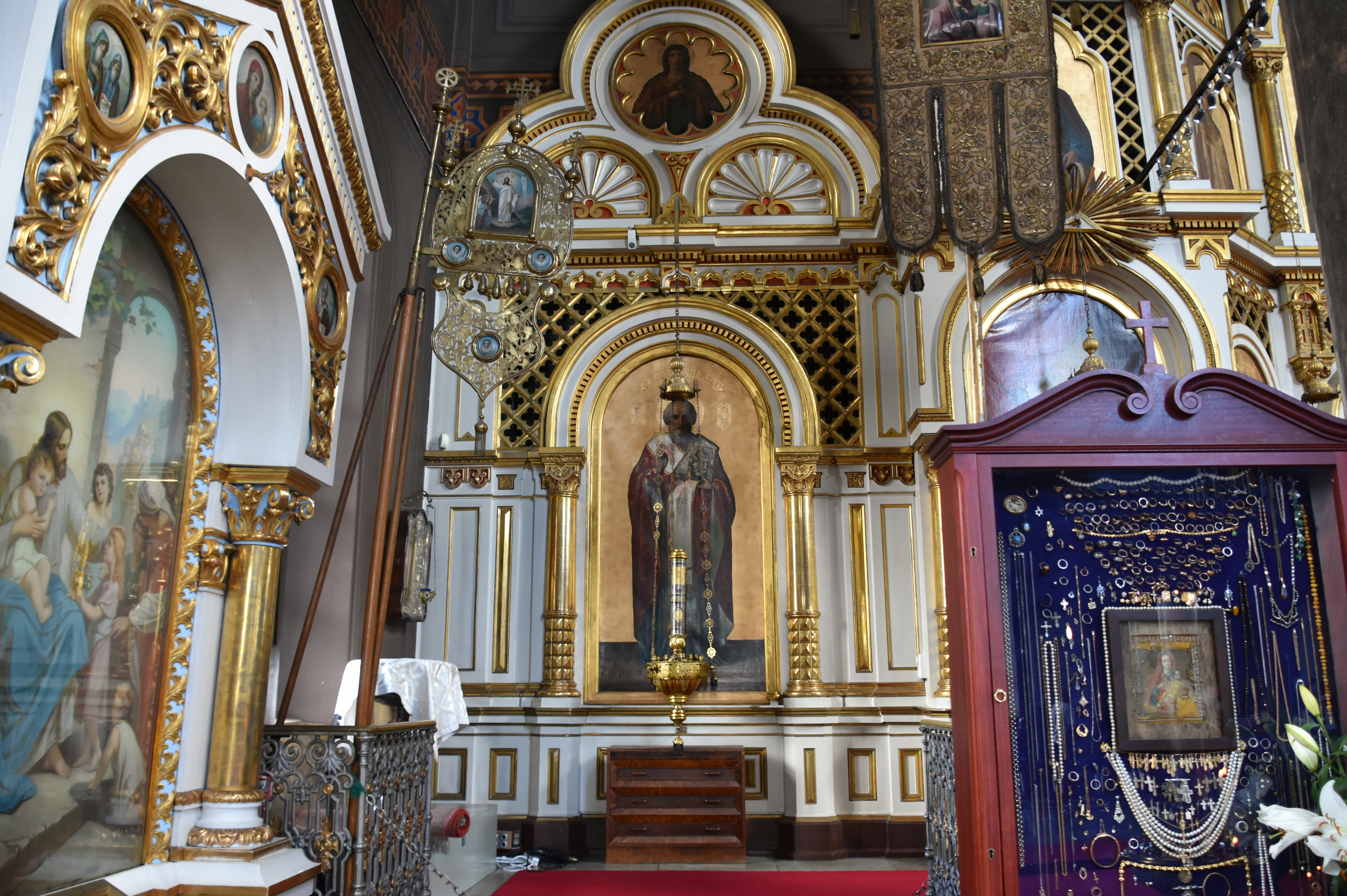
Theotokos of Kozeltshan on the right with jewelry donated by parishioners around it in 2017

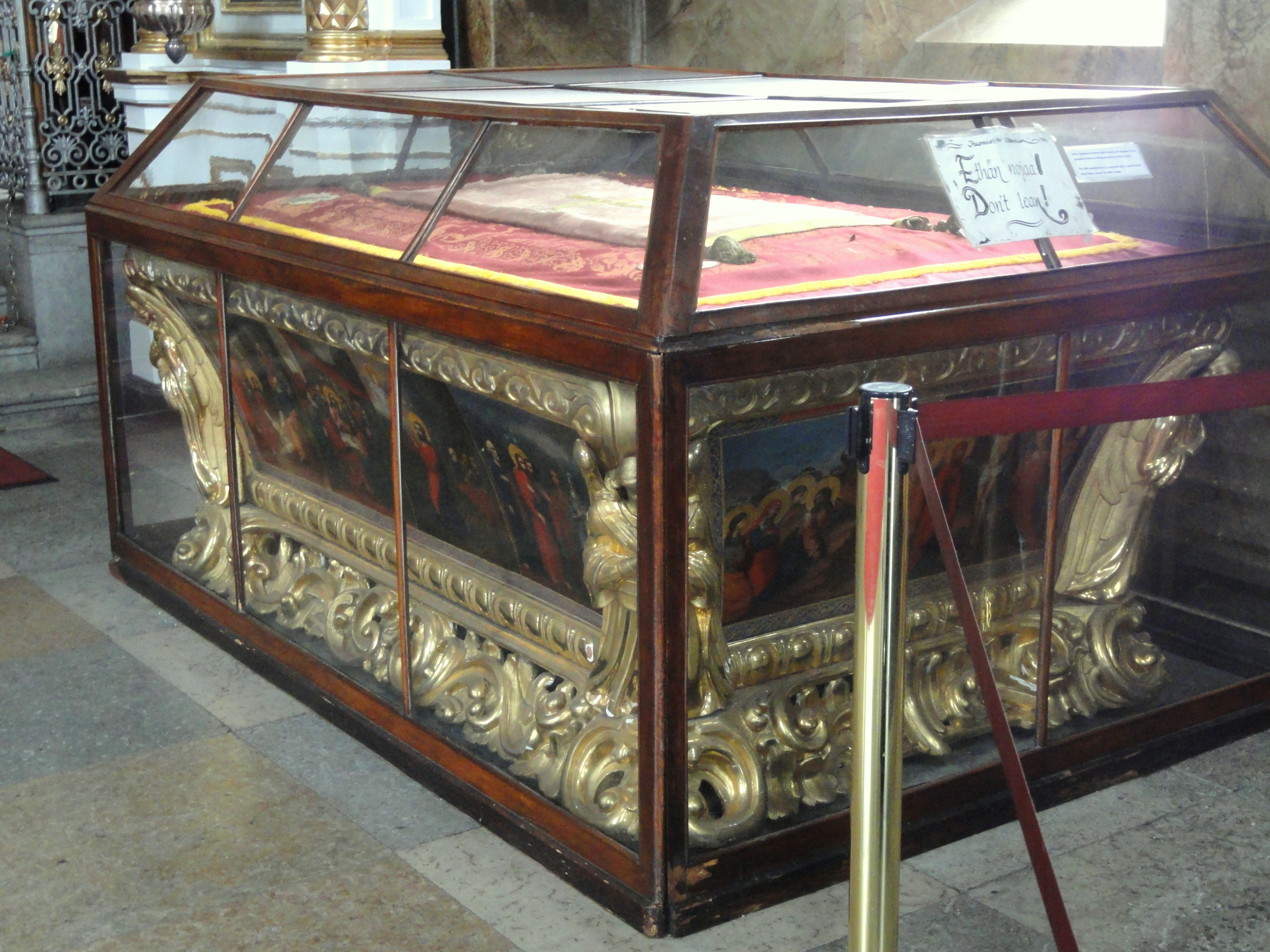
Interior details

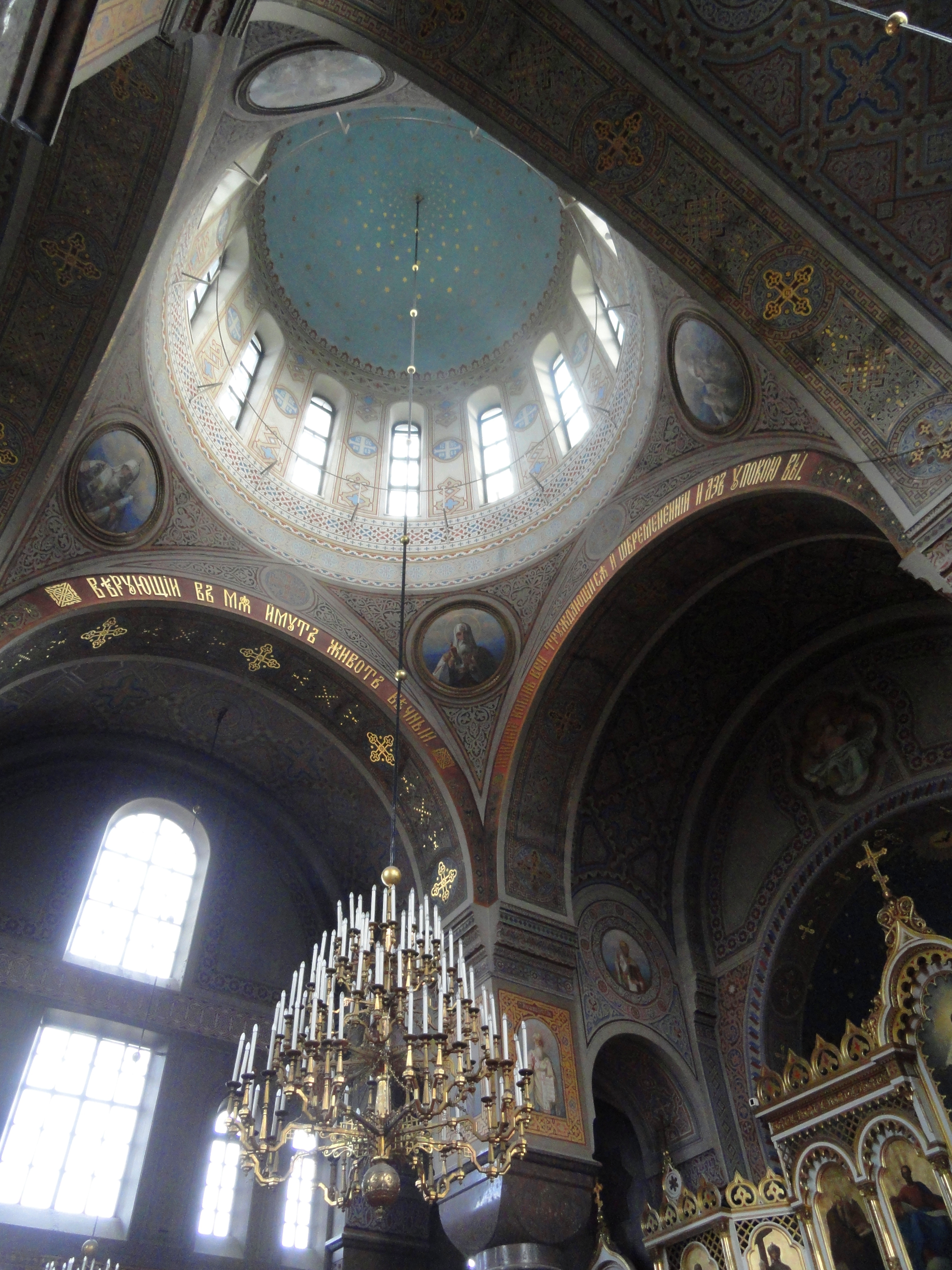
View into the dome

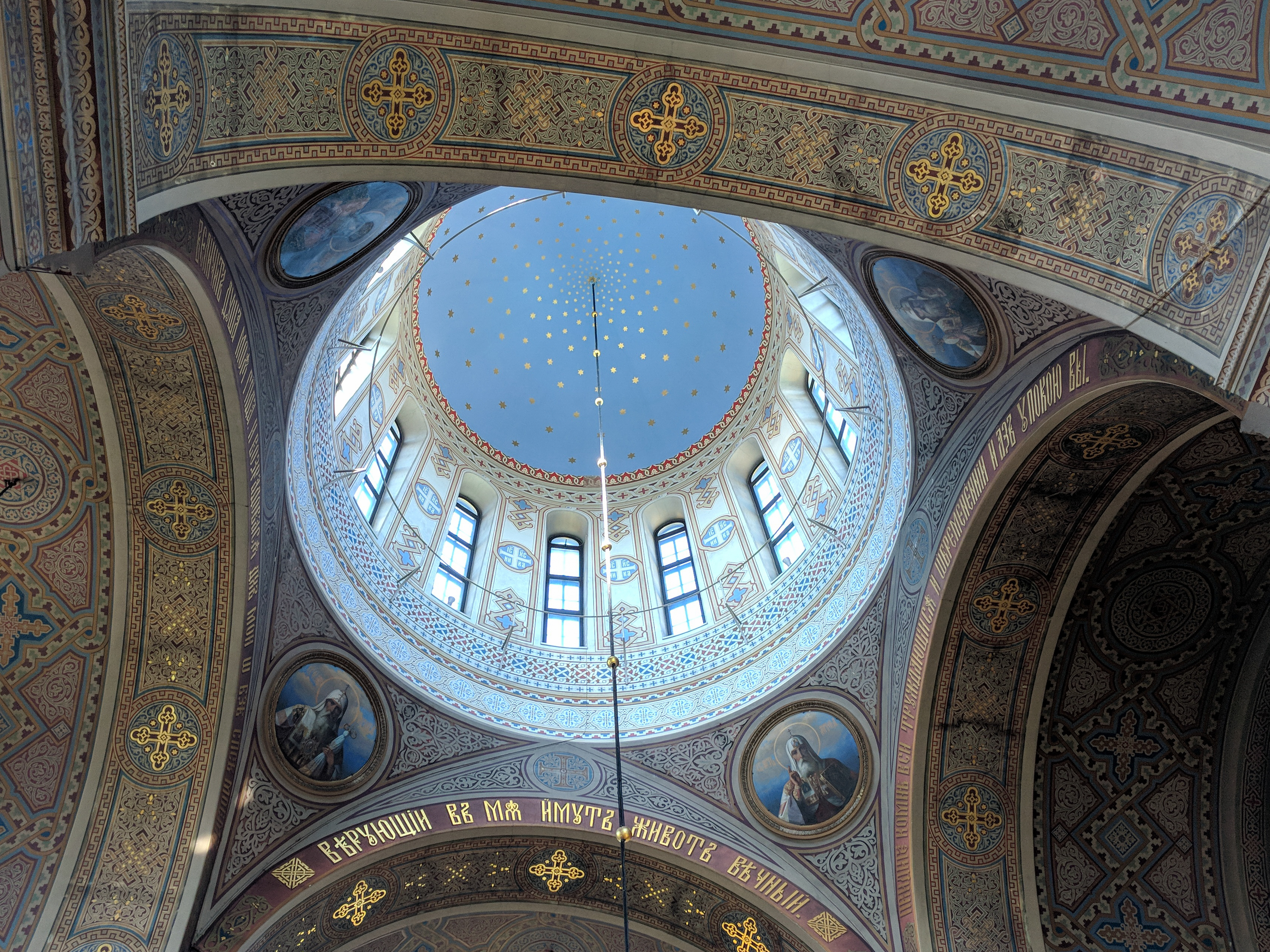
Dome detail

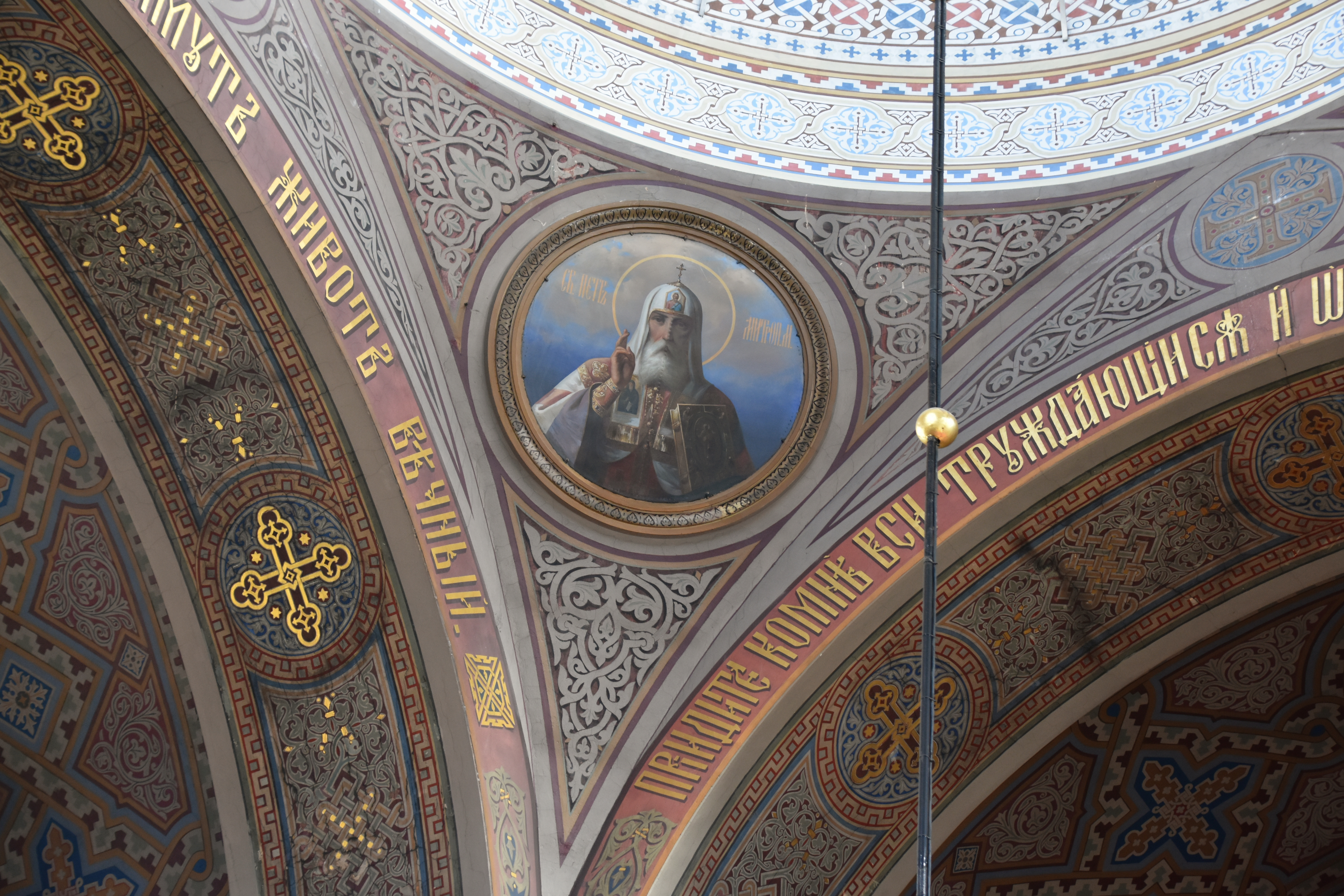
Ceiling detail

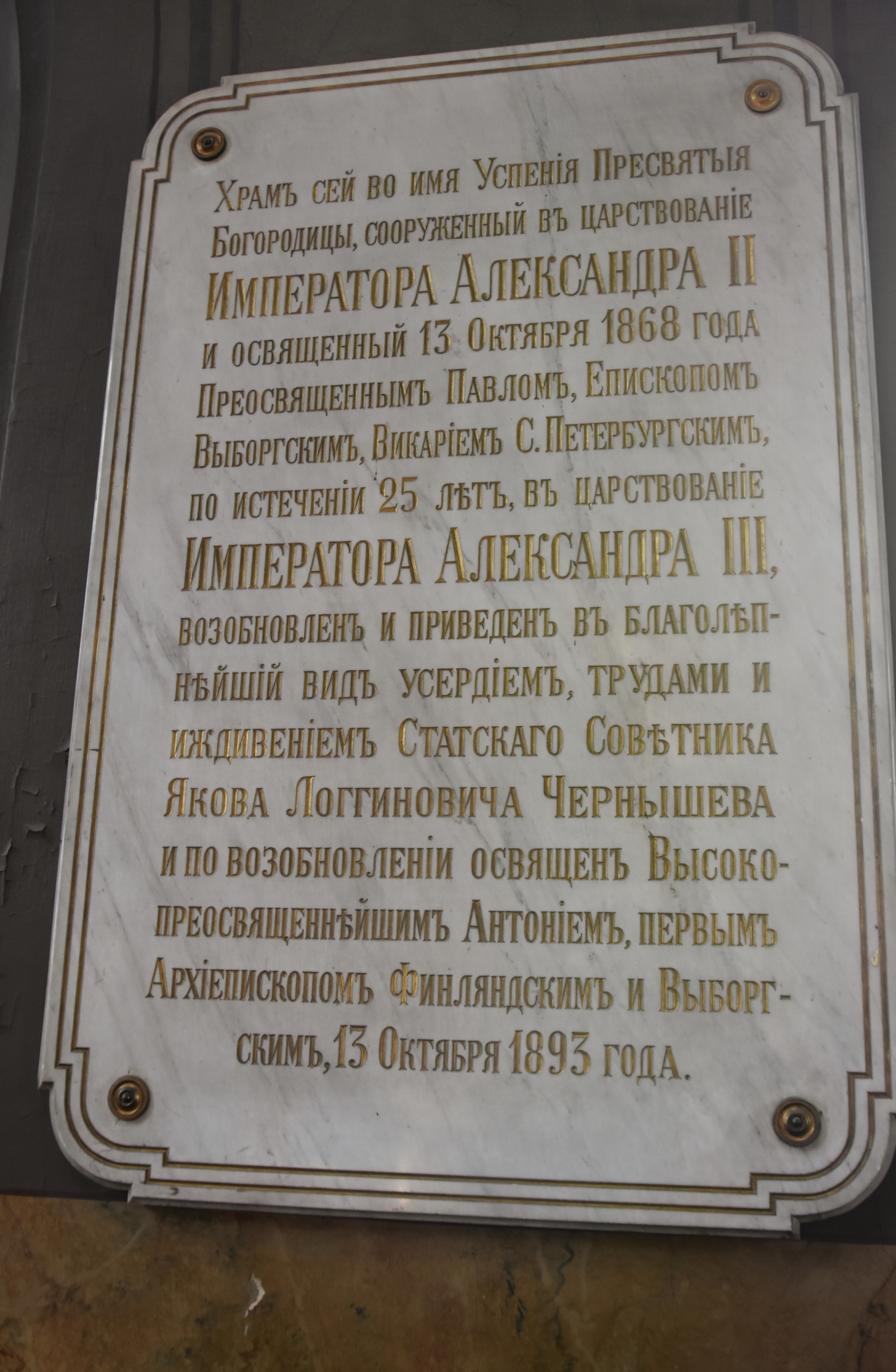
Plaque from the era of Alexander III

== See also ==
- Helsinki Cathedral
- St. Henry's Cathedral
- Holy Trinity Church, Helsinki
- List of largest Eastern Orthodox church buildings
