= Leo Makkonen =

Primate of the Finnish Orthodox Church

His Eminence Leo
- Archbishop of Helsinki and all Finland
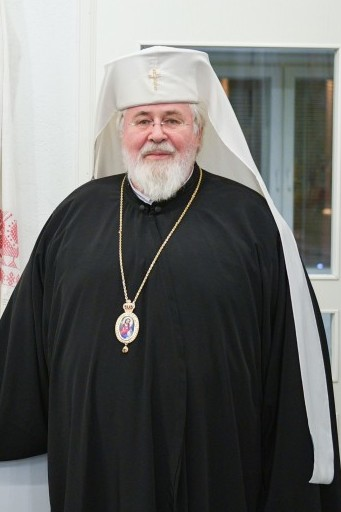
- Leo in 2018
- Native name: Leo Makkonen
- Church: Orthodox Church of Finland
- Appointed: 27 October 2001
- Term ended: 29 November 2024
- Predecessor: John (Rinne)
- Successor: Elia (Wallgrén)
- Previous post: Bishop of Joensuu (1979) Metropolitan of Oulu (1980-1996) Metropolitan of Helsinki (1996-2001)

Orders
- Ordination: 22 July 1973 by Paul (Olmari)
- Consecration: 25 February 1979 by Paul (Olmari)

Personal details
- Born: Leo Makkonen; 4 June 1948 (age 78) Pielavesi, Finland
- Denomination: Eastern Orthodox Christianity
- Spouse: Anita (died 1976)
- Children: 1
- Education: University of Joensuu; St. Sergius Institute

Archbishop Leo (born 4 June 1948) is a former prelate of the Orthodox Church of Finland as Archbishop of Helsinki and All Finland.

== Background and career ==
He was born in Pielavesi in eastern Finland on 4 June 1948. After completing studies in 1972 at the Kuopio seminary, he was ordained to the deaconate on 20 July 1973 and to the priesthood two days later.

He was consecrated Bishop of Joensuu on 25 February 1979, then served as Metropolitan of Oulu from 1980–1996. From 1996–2001 he served as Metropolitan of Helsinki, before taking up his post as Archbishop of Karelia; he was enthroned on 27 October 2001.

From 1979–1993 he served as chair of the Fellowship of Saints Sergius and Herman.

Makkonen retired in November 2024 after the election of his successor Archbishop Elia (Wallgrén).

== Private life ==
Archbishop Leo is a widower. He has one daughter, and two grandchildren.

On his 60th birthday, Leo consecrated an eukterion in his hometown of Pielavesi. Building one had been a long-time dream of his.

== Honors ==
- Order of the Holy Lamb (Finnish Orthodox Church, Grand Master, 2001)
- Order of the Lion of Finland (Finland, 2006)
- Saint Henry Cross (Evangelical Lutheran Church of Finland, 2008)

Preceded by Johannes (Rinne)	Archbishop of Karelia and All Finland; 2001 - 2024	Succeeded by Elia (Wallgrén)
