= Order of the Holy Lamb =

Order of the Holy Lamb: Pyhän Karitsan ritarikunta; Heliga Lammets orden
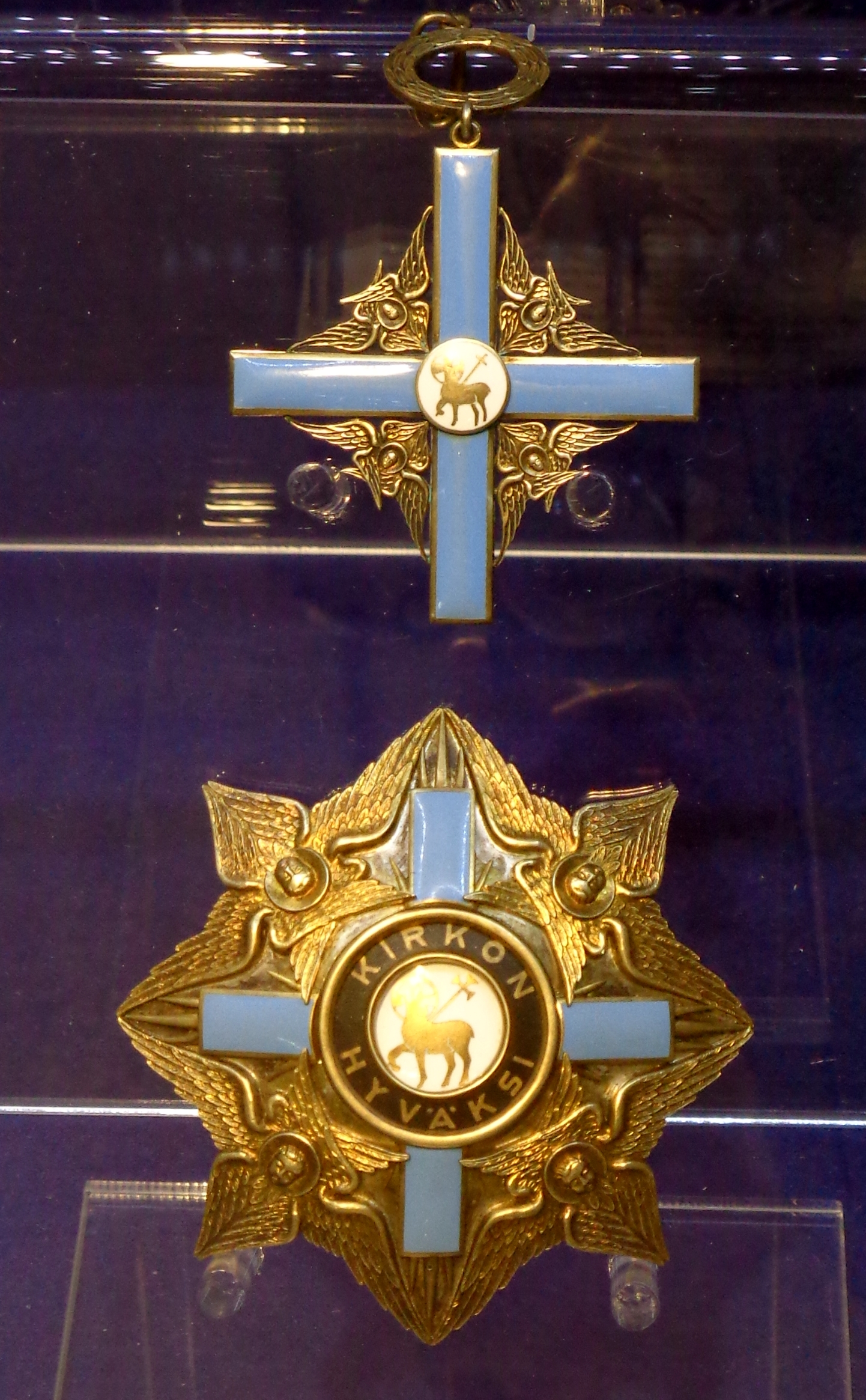
- Badge and star of the Grand Cross

Awarded by the Orthodox Church of Finland
- Type: Semi-official ecclesiastical order
- Established: June 20, 1935; 90 years ago
- Country: Finland
- Religious affiliation: Eastern Orthodox Church
- Seat: Kuopio
- Ribbon: Blue-gray with white stripes
- Motto: Kirkon hyväksi ('For the Good of the Church')
- Eligibility: Finnish nationals and foreigners, members and non-members of the Church
- Criteria: Meritous service in or for the Orthodox Church of Finland
- Status: Currently constituted
- First head: Archbishop Herman
- Grand Master: Archbishop Elia
- Classes: Grand Cross; Commander, First Class; Commander, Second Class; Knight/Member, First Class; Knight/Member, Second Class

Precedence
- Next (higher): Medal of Merit of Volunatry National Defence Work
- Ribbon of the Order of the Holy Lamb

The Order of the Holy Lamb (Finnish: Pyhän Karitsan ritarikunta; Swedish: Heliga Lammets orden) is a semi-official ecclesiastical order of Finland awarded by the Orthodox Church of Finland. Under the patronage of the Finnish state, its Grand Master is the Archbishop of the Orthodox Church of Finland. The order can be awarded to anyone regardless of religion or nationality who have made services to the Church.

== Semi-official status ==
The Order of the Holy Lamb can be classified as a semi-official ecclesiastical order and is unique among Finnish decorations in this regard. The term semi-official is somewhat unspecific, but is conventionally used in the Finnish context to denote those orders and decorations that are not established by the state but are recognized by it to a degree. For instance, the Order of the Holy Lamb is semi-official, because the Orthodox Church is a statutory corporation. Other semi-official decorations include those of the Evangelical Lutheran Church of Finland, Suomen Talousseura, and Finland Chamber of Commerce. In contrast to the other semi-official decorations, the Order of the Holy Lamb is an order because it is organized on the lines of an order and has a commonly accepted font of honor. Finally, while the Lutheran Church issues ecclesiastical decorations and there are some foreign ecclesiastical orders with activities in Finland – such as the Protestant Order of Saint John and the Catholic Order of the Holy Sepulchre – the Order of the Holy Lamb is the only ecclesiastical order native to Finland. Unlike these other religious orders, the Order of the Holy Lamb is purely an order of merit.

It is the only semi-official order of Finland, meaning that while not a state order it is still under the patronage and recognized to a degree by the state. Many countries have orders of Eastern Orthodox Churches with a comparable status. The order is recognized as legitimate by the International Commission for Orders of Chivalry.

Although not part of the official Finnish order of precedence, wearing the order alongside official decorations in state functions is permitted. The statutes of the order simply say that it is to be worn after the Order of the White Rose of Finland. The statutes, dating from 1935, however do not take into consideration subsequent developments in the Finnish order of precedence. Accordingly, the chancery of the Orders of the White Rose of Finland and the Lion of Finland specifies that it is to be worn after all official decorations and "Memorial Crosses and Memorial Medals of the War of Independence, Winter War, and Continuation War and other Crosses of Merit and Medals of Merit of patriotic activity in chronological order", the most junior of which is the Medal of Merit of Volunatry National Defence Work. Other semi-official decorations and unofficial ones come after the order.

== History ==
The Church's administrative council announced a design competition for insignia of a new order on January 10, 1933, and set up a three-person committee to oversee the competition. Designs by five participants were sent to the committee, with one of the participants wanting to take part only unofficially. On March 31, 1933, the committee announced the winning designs by Senior Deacon Leo Kasanko of Sortavala. The winning design included 12 drawings – six in color and another six in grayscale – by Kasanko. Only small changes were made, most notably with regards to the shape of the cross held by the Lamb of God, which was simplified to ease manufacturing. Finishing touches to the insignia were made by Oskar Pihl, who would go on to design the Mannerheim Cross, the insignia of the Order of the Lion of Finland, and the Finnish Olympic Cross of Merit and Medal of Merit.

The statutes of the order were approved by the general synod of the Orthodox Church of Finland in Sortavala on June 20, 1935, and a commission it had set affirmed the decision on November 8. Finnish President Pehr Evind Svinhufvud also assented to the formation of the new order in November.

The Evangelical Lutheran Church of Finland considered establishing an order of its own, emulating the model of the Order of the Holy Lamb. A committee worked on the proposal in 2002 but decided against an order, the Church instead instituting ecclesial decorations: the Saint Henry Cross, Mikael Agricola Cross, and Pro ecclesia Medal.

== Organization ==
The Archbishop of the Orthodox Church of Finland – currently Archbishop Elia – is the Grand Master of the order. The Church's administrative council, based in Kuopio, serves as the board of the order and records all holders in its minutes.

Nominations to the order are usually made by bishops and vicars of the Church. The order is conferred all year round. Since 1994 the order has been awarded also to distinguished mothers, mostly of large families, annually (from each diocese of the Church: Karelia, Helsinki, and Oulu). They are awarded with Knight, First Class. In addition to mothers, these recipients have included grandmothers and other women working with children. A similar tradition has existed in the Order of the White Rose of Finland since 1946.

== Classes ==
The order is organized along the lines of a standard five-class order with two additional medals. Awardees of the two lowest classes are titled Knights – First or Second Class – if they are laypeople, and Members – First or Second Class – if they are part of the clergy. The Grand Cross is primarily reserved for foreign bishops and archbishops and is rarely awarded to Finnish nationals. In principle, it can be awarded to other archbishops and bishops, members of the Finnish Government, and holders of the Grand Cross of the Order of the White Rose of Finland. The classes are:

- Grand Cross
- Commander, First Class
- Commander, Second Class
- Knight/Member, First Class
- Knight/Member, Second Class
- Medal, First Class
- Medal, Second Class

The insignia are generally thought to be of high value aesthetically. All classes have the same blue-gray ribbon with white stripes. Diplomas of the order used to be very ornate, but are now much simpler.

The order can be conferred to anyone regardless of their religion, so long as they have provided services to the Church. Many recipients are in fact Lutherans, members of the largest Church in Finland, the Evangelical Lutheran Church of Finland. The ecumenical nature of the order has been taken as a sign of the traditionally good relations between the Orthodox and Lutheran Churches in Finland. The order can also be conferred to foreigners. Foreigners' insignia must be returned after they have died. Internationally, the insignia of the order are hold in high esteem and generally recognized even abroad.

== Recipients of the Grand Cross ==
- Archbishop Herman
- Oskari Mantere
- Antti Kukkonen
- Aimo Cajander
- Arvi Oksala
- Arvo Manner
- Yrjö Puhakka
- Urho Kekkonen
- Archbishop Paul
- Bishop Aleksanteri
- Athenagoras I of Constantinople
- Porphyrios III
- Mikko Volotinen
- Patriarch Pimen I of Moscow
- Demetrios I of Constantinople
- Mauno Koivisto
- Tellervo Koivisto
- Archbishop John
- Konstantinos Karamanlis
- Konstantinos Mitsotakis
- Seraphim of Athens
- Anastasios Sideris
- Olli Bergman
- Bartholomew I of Constantinople
- Martti Ahtisaari
- Patriarch Peter VII of Alexandria
- Archbishop Leo

== See also ==
- Orders, decorations, and medals of Finland
- Ecclesiastical decoration
