= List of Eastern Orthodox saints (H–M) =

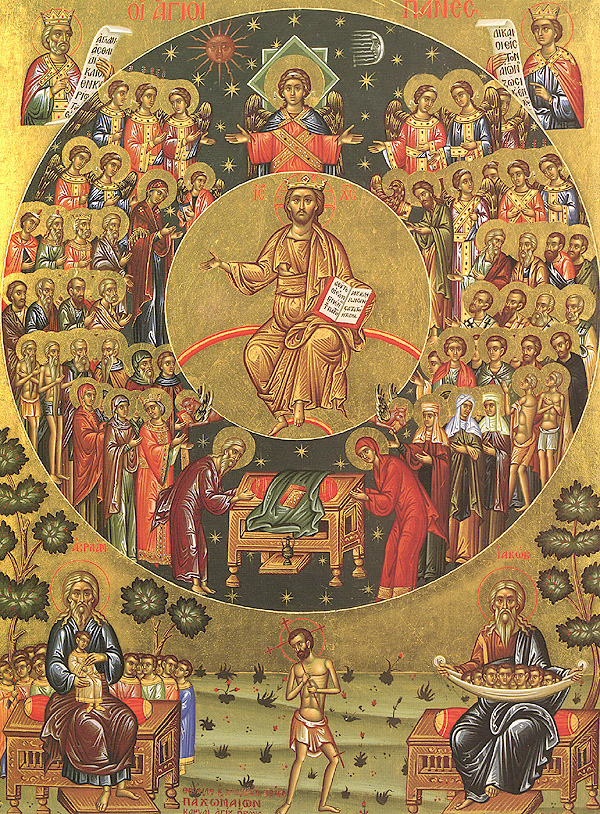
Icon depicting the Synaxis of All Saints; various saints can be identified by their saint attributes, such as Patriarch Abraham (bottom left, silver hair) or Patriarch Jacob (bottom right, seated)

This is an incomplete list of canonised saints in the Eastern Orthodox Church.

In Eastern Orthodoxy, a saint is defined as anyone, other than God, who is in heaven, whether recognised here on earth, or not. By this definition, Adam and Eve, Moses, the various prophets, and archangels are all given the title of Saint. Sainthood in the Orthodox Church does not necessarily reflect a moral model, but communion with God; there are many examples of people who lived in great sin and became saints by humility and repentance: Saints Mary of Egypt, Moses the Ethiopian, and Dismas, the repentant thief who was crucified with Jesus Christ. Therefore, a more complete Orthodox definition of what a saint is, has to do with the way that saints, through their humility and their love of mankind, saved inside them the entire Church, and loved all people.

Orthodox belief states that God reveals saints through answered prayers and other miracles. Saints are usually recognised by their local community, often by people who directly knew them. As their popularity grows they are often then recognised by the entire Church through the Holy Spirit. The word canonisation means that a Christian has been found worthy to have his name placed in the canon (official list) of saints of the Church. The formal process of recognition involves deliberation by a synod of bishops. Evidence of a virtuous life and prior local veneration of the saint are required for canonization.

Because the Church shows no true distinction between the living and the dead, as the saints are considered to be alive in heaven, saints are referred to as if they are still alive, and are venerated, not worshipped. They are believed to be able to intercede for the living for salvation or other requests and help mankind either through direct communion with God or by personal intervention.

== List ==
Some saints listed may also be a part of a larger group of saints also listed (particularly martyrs, such as Saint Laura of Córdoba and the Martyrs of Córdoba).

Image	Saint	Died (Year)	Feast Day (NS/OS)	Notes
	Habakkuk	650–570 BC	2 December	Prophet; who wrote the Book of Habakkuk; a.k.a. Habacuc
	Habakkuk the Deacon	1814	30 December [O.S. 17 December]	New Venerable Hieromartyr, Hierodeacon, who was martyred with St. Paisius; birth name Lepoje Prodanović
	Haggai	600–501 BC	16 December	Prophet; who wrote the Book of Amos; a.k.a. Aggeus
	Hannah	1100–1001 BC	Sunday of the Holy Forefathers	Prophetess, mother of Prophet Samuel
	Hegesippus the Nazarene	c. 180	7 April	Church Father, the Nazarene; who wrote against Gnosticism and Marcionism
	Helladius, Crescentius, Paul and Dioscorides	244 / 326	28 May	Martyrs
	Helena of Constantinople	327	21 May	Equal-to-the-Apostles, Empress of the Roman Empire, mother of St. Constantine
	Helena of Dečani	c. 1357	3 June [O.S. 21 May]	Right-Believing, Empress consort of Bulgaria, Venerable, daughter of St. Milutin; regnal name Ana-Neda
	Helena of Serbia	1314	12 November [O.S. 30 October]	Right-Believing, Venerable, Queen consort of Serbia, wife of St. Uroš the Great, Ktetor, who founded Gradac Monastery; a.k.a. Helena of Anjou
	Helena Štiljanović	1546	17 October [O.S. 4 October]	Venerable, wife of St. Stephen Štiljanović; tonsured as Elizabeth
	Helier	555	16 July	Venerable Martyr
	Heimerad	1019	28 June	Fool for Christ, Venerable Hieromonk; a.k.a. Heimrad, Haimrad and Heimo
	Herman of Alaska	1837	9 August	Venerable Wonderworker of all America
	Herman of Kazan and Svyazhsk	1567	6 November / 25 September / 23 June	Archbishop of Kazan, Venerable
	Herman of Solovki	1479	30 July / 8 August	Venerable, one of the founders of the Solovetsky Monastery
	Herman of Valaam	901–1500	28 June	Venerable, co-founder of the Valaam Monastery with St. Sergius of Valaam
	Hermas of Dalmatia	33–100	8 April / 4 January	Apostle of the Seventy, Bishop of Dalmatia, Hieromartyr; a.k.a. Hermes
	Hermas of Philippopolis	33–150	31 May / 5 November / 4 January	Apostle of the Seventy, Bishop of Philippopolis; a.k.a. Hermes
	Hermione of Ephesus	117	4 September	Unmercenary Healer, Martyr, daughter of St. Philip the Deacon
	Hermogenes Dolganyov	1918	16 June / 20 August	Bishop of Tobolsk, New Venerable Hieromartyr
	Herodion of Patras	c. 64 – c. 68	8 April / 4 January	Apostle of the Seventy, Bishop of Patara, Hieromartyr, martyred with St. Olympas; a.k.a. Herodian or Rodion
	Hesychius of Jerusalem	c. 440	28 March	Church Father; a.k.a. Hesychius the Priest and Hesychios
	Hezekiah	c. 687 BC	28 August / Cheesefare Saturday	Righteous, King of Judah
	Hierotheos the Thesmothete	52–100	4 October	Bishop of Athens, Venerable, the Thesmothete
	Hilarion the Great	371	21 October	Desert Father, Venerable, founder of Palestinian monasticism
	Hilarion of Kiev	1054 / 1055	21 October	Metropolitan of Kiev and all Rus', Venerable; first non-Greek to hold the position
	Hilarius of Rome	468	28 February	Patriarch of Rome, Venerable; who fought against Nestorianism and Eutychianism; a.k.a. Hilary and Hilarus
	Hilary of Arles	449	5 May	Bishop of Arles, Venerable
	Hilary of Galeata	558	15 May	Venerable, Hermit; who founded the Monastery of Galeata
	Hilary of Poitiers	368	13 January or 14 January	Church Father, Bishop of Poitiers, Venerable Hieroconfessor; who fought against Arianism
	Hilda of Whitby	680	17 November	Abbess of Whitby, Venerable
	Hippolytus of Rome	c. 235	30 January	Church Father, Venerable Hieromartyr
	Honoratus of Amiens	c. 600	16 May	Bishop of Amiens, Venerable
	Honoratus of Arles	429	16 January	Bishop of Arles, Venerable, who founded Lérins Abbey
	Honorius of Canterbury	653	30 September	Archbishop of Canterbury, Venerable
	Hormisdas of Rome	523	6 August	Patriarch of Rome, Venerable
	Hosea	720 BC	17 October	Prophet; who wrote the Book of Hosea; a.k.a. Osee
	Hubert of Liège	727	3 November	Apostle of the Ardennes, Bishop of Liège, Venerable
	Hur	c. 1569 BC	Sunday of the Holy Forefathers	Prophet, High Priest, companion of Prophets Moses and Aaron
	Hyginus of Rome	142	11 January	Patriarch of Rome, Venerable Hieromartyr
	Hypomone	1450	11 June [O.S. 29 May]	Venerable, Empress consort of the Byzantine Empire, wife of St. Manuel II Palaiologos; birth name Jelena Dragaš
	Iestyn	550–700	5 December	Venerable Martyr; who founded 2 churches in Gwynedd and Anglesey; a.k.a. Iestin, Justinus and Justinian
	Ignatius Brianchaninov	1867	30 April	Bishop of the Caucasus and Stavropol, Venerable
	Ignatius of Antioch	c. 107	20 December	God-Bearer (Theophoros), Patriarch of Antioch, Venerable Hieromartyr
	Ignatius of Constantinople	877	23 October	Ecumenical Patriarch of Constantinople, Venerable
	Igor II of Kiev	1147	19 September	Right-Believing, Martyr, Grand Prince of Kiev and Chernigov
	Ilya Pechersky	c. 1203	19 December	Venerable; most likely historical basis for the legendary Russian hero Ilya Muromets
	Innocent of Alaska	1879	13 April	Church Father, Apostle of America, Enlightener of the Aleuts, Metropolitan of Moscow, Venerable
	Innocent of Irkutsk	1731	26 November / 9 February / 2 September	Bishop of Irkutsk, Venerable
	Innocent I of Rome	417	28 July	Patriarch of Rome, Venerable, son of St. Anastasius I; who condemned Pelagianism
	Irenaeus of Lyon	200	23 August / 28 June	Church Father, Bishop of Lugdunum (now Lyon), Venerable Hieromartyr, disciple of St. Polycarp; who wrote Against Heresies against Gnosticism
	Irenarch of Rostov	1616	13 January	Venerable; a.k.a. Irenarchus and Irenarch the Recluse
	Irene of Cappadocia	912	28 July	Hegumenia of Chrysovolantou, Venerable; a.k.a. Irene Chrysovolantou
	Irene of Hungary	1134	13 August	Byzantine Empress, Venerable
	Irene of Macedonia	315	5 May	Great Martyr, Virgin Martyr
	Irene of Tomar	653	20 October	Virgin Martyr, Venerable
	Irmina of Oeren	708 / 720	24 December	Abbess of Oeren, Venerable
	Isaac	Patriarchal Age	Sunday of the Holy Forefathers	Patriarch, Righteous
	Isaac I of Optina	1894	22 August /	Hegumen of Optina Monastery, Archimandrite, Venerable, one of the 14 Optina Elders
	Isaac II of Optina	1938	26 December /	Hegumen of Optina Monastery, New Venerable Martyr, one of the 14 Optina Elders
	Isaac of Armenia	439	20 November	Patriarch of Armenia, Venerable
	Isaac of Córdoba	851	3 June	Venerable Martyr; one of the 48 Martyrs of Córdoba
	Isaac of Spoleto	550	12 April	Abbot of Spoleto, Venerable; a.k.a. Isaac the Syrian
	Isaac the Confessor	383	22 March / 30 May / 3 August	Venerable Confessor; a.k.a. Isaac of Dalmatia
	Isaac the Syrian	c. 700	28 January	Church Father, Desert Father, Bishop of Nineveh, Venerable Hieromonk
	Isaiah	700–601 BC	9 May	Prophet; who wrote the Book of Isaiah; a.k.a. Isaias
	Isaiah of Gaza	491	3 July	Desert Father, Venerable; a.k.a. Isaiah the Solitary, Abba Isaiah, and possibly also Isaiah of Scetis
	Isaiah of Onogošt	1601–1625	11 May [O.S. 28 April]	Venerable hermit, who built a cave church in what is now Ostrog Monastery; a.k.a. Isaiah of Ostrog
	Isaiah of Rostov	1090	15 May	Bishop of Rostov, Venerable Wonderworker
	Isidora of Tabenna	c. 365	10 May	Venerable, Fool for Christ, Blessed
	Isidore of Pelusium	c. 450	4 February	Church Father, Desert Father, Venerable Hieromonk; a.k.a. Isidore the Priest
	Isidore of Seville	636	4 April	Church Father, Bishop of Seville, Venerable, brother of Saints Leander of Seville and Fulgentius of Cartagena
	Íte of Killeedy	c. 570	15 January	Venerable; a.k.a. Ytha and Meda
	Jacob	Patriarchal Age	13 December	Patriarch, Righteous; a.k.a. Israel
	Jacob the New of Tuman	1946	21 August [O.S. 8 August]	New Venerable Confessor; tortured by the Communists for distributing 8,000 copies of the Lord's Prayer at a train station in Požarevac
	Jacob of Serbia	1292	16 February [O.S. 3 February]	7th Archbishop of Serbia (r. 1286–1292), Venerable
	Jacob of Rostov	1392	27 November	Bishop of Rostov, Venerable, founder of Spaso-Yakovlevsky Monastery
	Jaglika of Piva	1943	28 July [O.S. 15 July]	New Martyr, one of the 46 New Martyrs of Plužine in the Doli Pivski massacre
	James Intercisus	420	27 November	Great Martyr, Military Saint; a.k.a. James the Mutilated, James the Persian or Jacob the Persian and Akouphos
	James the Deacon	c. 671 – c. 771	18 October	Deacon, Missionary, companion of St. Paulinus on the Gregorian mission
	James the Great	44	30 April / 30 June	Apostle, Martyr, son of Zebedee
	James the Just	62 / 69	23 October / 4 January	Brother of the Lord, Apostle of the Seventy, Patriarch of Jerusalem, Hieromartyr, the Just; who wrote the Epistle of James
	James the Less	c. 62	9 October / 30 June	Apostle, Martyr, the Less, son of Alphaeus
	Jason of Thessalonica	33–150	28 April / 29 April / 4 January	Apostle of the Seventy, Bishop of Tarsus
	Jegudiel the Archangel	N/A (Note: According to Christian theology, angels do not die.)	8 November	Archangel
	Jeremiah	c. 570 BC	1 May	Prophet; who wrote the Book of Jeremiah, Book of Lamentations and the Books of Kings; a.k.a. Jeremias
	Jeremias I of Constantinople	1546	13 January	Ecumenical Patriarch of Constantinople, Venerable, name also spelled Jeremias
	Jeremiel the Archangel	N/A (Note: According to Christian theology, angels do not die.)	8 November	Archangel
	Jerome of Pavia	787	19 July	Bishop of Pavia, Venerable
	Jerome of Stridon	420	15 June	Church Father, Blessed; a.k.a. Hieronymus
	Joachim	c. 15 BC	9 September	Father of the Virgin Mary, Righteous
	Joachim of Korsun	1030	19 June	Archbishop of Novgorod, Venerable
	Joanna	36–100	27 June / Sunday of the Holy Myrrhbearers	Myrrhbearer, wife of Chuza
	Joannicius of Devič	1464	15 December [O.S. 2 December]	Wonderworker, Venerable; a.k.a. Janićije
	Joannicius I of Montenegro	1945	17 June [O.S. 4 June]	Metropolitan of Montenegro and the Littoral, New Venerable Hieromartyr; surnamed Lipovac
	Joannicius II of Serbia	1354	16 September [O.S. 3 September]	1st Patriarch of Serbia, previously 12th Archbishop of Serbia,(r. 1338–1346, 1346–1354), Venerable; the Serbian Church was made autocephalous and declared a Patriarchate during his reign in 1346
	Joasaph of Belgorod	1754	10 December	Bishop of Belgorod, Venerable
	Job	c. 1350 BC	6 May	Righteous, the Long-suffering
	Joasaph of Meteora	1422 / 1423	3 May [O.S. 20 April]	Venerable, titular Emperor of Serbs and Greeks; native name Jovan Uroš Nemanjić; a.k.a. John Ouresis Doukas Palaiologos
	Job of Manyava	1621	24 June	Hegumen, Venerable; who founded of Manyava Skete
	Job of Moscow	1607	19 June	Patriarch of Moscow, Venerable
	Job of Pochayiv	1651	28 October	Hegumen, Venerable Wonderworker
	Joel	750 BC	19 October	Prophet; who wrote the Book of Joel
	John and Paul	361–363	26 June	Martyrs
	John Angeloptes	433	27 November	Bishop of Ravenna, Venerable
	John Angelus	1050	31 January	Venerable
	John Calybite	c. 450	15 January	Venerable, the Hut-Dweller, name also spelled Calabites, Calibita, Chalybita, Calabytes and Kalabytes
	John Cassian	433	23 July	Church Father, Desert Father, Venerable; a.k.a. John the Ascetic and John Cassian the Roman
	John Chrysostom	407	27 January	Church Father, Archbishop of Constantinople, Venerable Hieroconfessor, the Golden-Tongued; a.k.a. John I of Constantinople
	John Climacus	606	29 February / 28 February	Church Father, Venerable; a.k.a. John of the Ladder, John Scholasticus and John Sinaites
	John Gradenigo	1025	5 December	Venerable, Hermit
	John I of Naples	401–500	22 June	Bishop of Naples, Venerable
	John of Ravenna	494	12 January	Bishop of Ravenna, Venerable
	John I of Rome	526	18 May	Patriarch of Rome, Venerable
	John III of Constantinople	577	21 February	Patriarch of Constantinople, Venerable; a.k.a. John Scholasticus and John the Scholastic
	John IV of Constantinople	595	2 September / 30 August	Ecumenical Patriarch of Constantinople, Venerable; a.k.a. John the Faster and John Nesteutes
	John IV of Naples	835	22 June	Bishop of Naples, Venerable, the Peacemaker
	John V of Constantinople	674	18 August	Ecumenical Patriarch of Constantinople, Venerable
	John VIII of Constantinople	1075	30 August	Ecumenical Patriarch of Constantinople, Venerable; a.k.a. John Xiphilinos
	John Kochurov	1917	31 October	New Hieromartyr, Protomartyr of the New Martyrs and Confessors of the Russian Orthodox Church
	John Theristus	1129	24 February	Venerable, the Harvester
	John Vincent	1012	21 December	Archbishop of Ravenna, Venerable, Hermit
	John of Autun	33–1054	29 October	Bishop of Autun, Venerable
	John of Bergamo	690	11 July	Bishop of Bergamo, Venerable
	John of Beverley	721	7 May	Bishop of York, Venerable
	John of Châlon	475	9 May	Bishop of Chalon-sur-Saône, Venerable
	John of Chinon	501–600	27 June	Venerable, Hermit
	John of Constantinople	839	27 April	Hegumen, Venerable Confessor, iconodule
	John of Damascus	749	4 December	Church Father, Venerable Hieromonk, hymnographer and polymath; a.k.a. John (the) Damascene
	John of Egypt	c. 394	29 March	Desert Father, Venerable, Anchorite; a.k.a. John of Lycopolis, John the Hermit and John the Anchorite
	John of Gorze	975	27 February	Abbot of Gorze Abbey, Venerable
	John of Gothia	c. 791	26 June	Bishop of Gothia (Gothic Crimea), Venerable
	John of Karpathos	1001–1500	25 August	Bishop of Karpathos, Venerable
	John of Kronstadt	1908	20 December	Righteous, Priest
	John of Moscow	c. 1589	3 July	Blessed, Fool for Christ, Wonderworker of Moscow
	John the New of Serbia	1502	23 December [O.S. 10 December]	Right-Believing, Despot of Serbia, husband of St. Angelina; surnamed Branković
	John of Novgorod	1186	7 September / 1 December	Archbishop of Novgorod, Venerable Wonderworker
	John of Pavia	813	27 August	Bishop of Pavia, Venerable
	John of Pskov	1616	24 October	Venerable, Hermit
	John of Rila	946	18 October	Venerable Wonderworker, Hermit, founder of Rila Monastery
	John of Réôme	539	28 January	Venerable, Hermit
	John of Shanghai and San Francisco	1966	2 July	Archbishop of Shanghai and San Francisco, Venerable Wonderworker, native name John Maximovitch
	John of Sonkajanranta	1918	13 July	Martyr, Confessor, Enlightener, native name Johannes Karhapää
	John of Syracuse	609	23 October	Bishop of Syracuse, Venerable
	John of Tobolsk	1715	10 June	Metropolitan of Tobolsk and all Siberia, Venerable Wonderworker, native name Ioann Maksimovich Vasilkovski
	John of Tuy	801–900	24 June	Hermit
	John of Valamo	1958	5 June	Venerable
	John of Verona	601–700	6 June	Bishop of Verona, Venerable
	John Vladimir	1016	4 June [O.S. 22 May]	Wonderworker, Myroblyte, Great Martyr, King of Duklja
	John the Apostle	100	26 September / 30 June	Apostle, Evangelist, Theologian, Beloved Friend of Christ, son of Zebedee; who wrote the Gospel of John, Johannine epistles, and the Book of Revelation; a.k.a. John of Patmos
	John the Baptist	36	7 January / 24 June / 23 September / 29 August	Prophet, Forerunner, the Baptist
	John the Dwarf	c. 405	9 November	Desert Father, Venerable; a.k.a. John the Short
	John the Good	c. 660	10 January	Bishop of Milan, Venerable; who fought against Arianism and Monothelitism; a.k.a. John Camillus
	John the Hairy	1580	12 November	Blessed, Fool for Christ, the Hairy; a.k.a. John of Rostov and John the Merciful of Rostov
	John the Hieromartyr	362	23 June	Hieromartyr
	John the Merciful	616–620	12 November	Patriarch of Alexandria, Venerable; a.k.a. John V Eleemon, John the Almsgiver, John the Almoner and John the Compassionate
	John the New Merciful	c. 1190	29 April	Metropolitan of Thebes, Venerable; a.k.a. John Kaloktenes
	John the Prophet	c. 543	6 February	Desert Father, Venerable; author (together with St. Barsanuphius the Great) of over 800 letters giving spiritual direction that influenced Byzantine monasticism
	John the Russian	1730	27 May	Confessor of the Faith; a Russian soldier captured by the Ottomans during the Russo-Turkish War of 1710-1711 and enslaved to a Turkish agha
	John the Saxon	c. 895	22 February	Abbot of Athelney, Venerable; a.k.a. John the Old Saxon, John of Saxony or Scotus
	Jonah	800–701 BC	21 September	Prophet; who wrote the Book of Jonah; a.k.a. Jonas
	Jonah of Manchuria	1925	7 October	Enlightener and Bishop of Hankou, Venerable
	Jonah of Moscow	1461	15 June	Metropolitan of Kiev and all Rus', Venerable
	Jonathan	c. 1010 BC	Sunday of the Holy Forefathers	Righteous, friend of Prophet David
	Josaphat of India	350–450	26 August / 19 November	Prince of India; a.k.a. Budhasaf
	Joseph the Betrothed	8–25	Sunday after Christmas / Sunday of the Holy Forefathers	Righteous, the earthly father of Jesus Christ, who was betrothed to the Virgin Mary; a.k.a. Joseph of Nazareth
	Joseph, son of Jacob	c. 1700 BC	31 March / Sunday of the Holy Forefathers / Holy Monday	Patriarch, Righteous, the All-comely, the Fair, founder of the Tribe of Joseph and son of Patriarch Jacob
	Joseph of Arimathea	33–100	31 July / Sunday of the Myrrhbearers / Third Sunday of Easter /	Righteous, Myrrhbearer, Secret Disciple of Jesus
	Joseph of Freising	764	17 January	Bishop of Freising, Venerable; a.k.a. Joseph of Verona
	Joseph the Hesychast	1959	16 August	Venerable, Hesychast, the Cave-Dweller
	Joseph the Hymnographer	886	4 April	Venerable, Hymnographer
	Joseph of Panephysis	301–500	17 June	Desert Father, Venerable; a.k.a. Joseph of Panepho and Joseph the Anchorite
	Joseph of Timișoara	1656	28 September [O.S. 15 September]	Metropolitan of Timișoara, Venerable; a.k.a. Joseph the New
	Joshua	1544 BC	1 September / Sunday of the Holy Forefathers	Righteous, son of Nun; who succeeded Prophet Moses as leader of the Israelites
	Jude the Apostle	65	19 June / 30 June	Brother of the Lord, Apostle, Martyr; who wrote the Epistle of Jude; a.k.a. Lebbaeus and Thaddeus
	Judith	c. 550 BC – c. 450 BC	Sunday of the Holy Forefathers	Righteous
	Juliana of Lazarevo	1604	2 January	Righteous, ; a.k.a. Juliana of Murom
	Juliana of Nicomedia	c. 304	21 December	Virgin Martyr
	Julius and Aaron	c. 305	1 July	Martyrs
	Julius of Novara	390 / 401	31 January	Missionary Priest
	Julius of Rome	190	19 August	Martyr
	Julius I of Rome	352	12 April	Patriarch of Rome, Venerable
	Julius the Veteran	304	27 May	Martyr, Military Saint
	Junia	33–100	17 May	Martyr
	Junian of Mairé	587	13 August	Venerable, Hermit, founder of Mairé monastery
	Junian of Saint-Junien	401–500	16 October	Venerable, Hermit
	Justin Martyr	165	1 June	Church Father, Philosopher, Martyr
	Justin of Ćelije	1979	14 June [O.S. 1 June]	Hegumen of Ćelije Monastery, Venerable, who wrote against communism and ecumenism; surnamed Popović
	Justin of Chieti	c. 540	1 January	Bishop of Chieti, Venerable
	Justin the Confessor	259	17 September	Hieromartyr
	Justinian I	565	14 November	Byzantine Emperor, Champion of Orthodoxy; a.k.a. Justinian the Great
	Justinian of Brittany	501–600	5 December	Venerable Martyr; a.k.a. Iestin
	Justus and Pastor	c. 304	6 August	Child Martyrs
	Justus of Beauvais	287	18 October	Child Martyr
	Justus of Canterbury	627	10 November	Archbishop of Canterbury, Bishop of Rochester, Venerable
	Justus of Eleutheropolis	33–100	30 October / 4 January	Apostle of the Seventy, Bishop of Eleutheropolis, Hieromartyr, the Just; a.k.a. Joseph Barsabbas
	Justus of Lyon	390	2 September / 14 October	Bishop of Lyon, Venerable, Hermit
	Justus of Trieste	303	2 November	Martyr
	Justus of Urgell	c. 527	28 May	Bishop of Urgell, Venerable; who commentated on the Song of Songs
	Juvenaly of Alaska	1796	24 September	Protomartyr of America, Hieromartyr
	Karbelashvili Brothers	1879–1936	6 September	Venerable brothers and hieromonks; whose names were Pilimon, Andria, Petre, Polievktos and Vasil
	Kassia the Hymnographer	865	7 September	Venerable, the Hymnographer; a.k.a. Kassiani and Cassia
	Kenan	1535 AM	Sunday of the Holy Forefathers	Forefather, Righteous, name also spelled Qenan, Kaynan or Cainan
	Kevin of Glendalough	618	3 June	First Abbot of Glendalough, Venerable
	Kieran the Elder	c. 530	5 March	Bishop of Ossory, Venerable, one of the twelve Apostles of Ireland, the Elder; a.k.a. Ciarán mac Luaign and Ciarán of Saigir
	Kieran the Younger	c. 556	9 September	Abbot of Clonmacnoise, Venerable, one of the twelve Apostles of Ireland, the Younger; a.k.a. Ciarán mac an tSaeir, Ceran, Queran and Queranus
	Kilian	689	8 July	Apostle to the Franconians, Bishop of Würzburg, Venerable Hieromartyr, name also spelled Killian and Cillian
	Kuksha of the Kiev Caves	c. 1114	27 August	Venerable Hieromartyr
	Kuksha of Odessa	1964	16 September	New Venerable Confessor, Hieromonk
	Laura of Córdoba	864	19 October	Abbess, Venerable Martyr; one of the 48 Martyrs of Córdoba
	Laurence of Canterbury	619	2 February	Second Archbishop of Canterbury, Venerable
	Laurence of Siponto	c. 546	7 February	Bishop of Siponto, Venerable; a.k.a. Lawrence Majoranus
	Laurence the Illuminator	576	3 February	Bishop of Spoleto; Venerable, he is given the epithet Illuminator for his ability to heal both physical and spiritual blindness, per holy tradition
	Lawrence of Novara	c. 397	30 April	Martyr; who was martyred with a group of children he instructed
	Lawrence of Rome	258	10 August	Deacon, Hieromartyr
	Lazarus of Serbia	1389	28 June [O.S. 15 June]	Right-Believing, Great Martyr, Prince of Serbia, who was martyred at the Battle of Kosovo
	Lazarus of Bethany	33–100	17 March / 17 October / Lazarus Saturday	Friend of Christ, the Four-Days-Dead, Hierarch
	Lazarus of Milan	c. 450	11 February	Archbishop of Milan, Venerable
	Lazarus the Iconographer	865 / 867	17 November	Venerable, Iconographer, iconodule; a.k.a. Lazarus Zographos
	Leander of Seville	600	27 February	Bishop of Seville, Venerable, brother of Saints Isidore of Seville and Fulgentius of Cartagena
	Leo I of Rome	461	18 February	Church Father, Patriarch of Rome, Venerable; the first pope to be referred to as Patriarch of the West, a.k.a. Leo the Great
	Leo I the Thracian	474	20 January	Right-Believing; a.k.a. Leo the Great
	Leo II of Rome	683	3 July	Patriarch of Rome, Venerable
	Leo III of Rome	816	12 June	Patriarch of Rome, Venerable, who refused to add the Filioque to the Nicene Creed
	Leo and Paregorius	c. 260	18 February	Martyrs
	Leo of Catania	787	20 February	Bishop of Catania, Wonderworker, Venerable Hieroconfessor
	Leo of Cappadocia	c. 578 – c. 582	29 February / 28 February	Venerable; a.k.a. Leo the Cappadocian
	Leo of Montefeltro	366	1 August	First Bishop of Montefeltro, Venerable
	Leo of Nonantola	1000	20 November	Abbot of Nonantola Abbey, Venerable
	Leo of Rouen	c. 900	1 March	Bishop of Rouen, Venerable Hieromartyr; a.k.a. Leo of Carentan
	Leo of Sens	541	22 April	Bishop of Sens, Venerable
	Leo of Troyes	c. 550	25 May	Abbot of Mantenay, Venerable
	Leoluca	900	1 March	Abbot of Corleone, Venerable; a.k.a. Leone Luca, Leo Luke of Corleone, or Luke of Sicily
	Leodegar of Autun	c. 678	2 October	Bishop of Autun; Venerable Hieromartyr
	Leontius Stasievich	1972	28 January	Archimandrite, New Venerable Hieroconfessor; one of the New Martyrs and Confessors of the Russian Orthodox Church
	Liberius of Rome	366	27 August	Patriarch of Rome, Venerable
	Linus of Rome	c. 78	5 November / 4 January	Apostle of the Seventy, Patriarch of Rome, Venerable Hieromartyr
	Longinus the Centurion	33–100	16 October	Martyr; the Roman centurion who pierced the side of Jesus during the Crucifixion and later converted
	Lot	c. 2000 BC – c. 1901 BC	9 October / Sunday of the Holy Forefathers	Righteous, nephew of Patriarch Abraham
	Lot of Egypt	c. 401	22 October	Desert Father, Venerable
	Luarsab II	1622	21 June	Martyr, King of Kartli
	Lubentius of Dietkirchen	c. 370	13 October	Priest
	Lucanus of Sabiona	401–500	30 October	Martyr; a.k.a. Lucanus of Säben
	Lucian of Antioch	312	15 October	Church Father, Presbyter, Hieromartyr
	Lucius of Adrianople	c. 350	11 February	Bishop of Adrianople, Venerable Hieromartyr
	Lucius of Britain	101–200	3 December	King of the Britons
	Lucius of Laodicea	33–150	22 April / 10 September / 4 January	Apostle of the Seventy, Bishop of Laodicea; a.k.a. Lucius of Cyrene, Luke and Loukias
	Lucius I of Rome	254	4 March	Patriarch of Rome, Venerable Hieromartyr or Hieroconfessor
	Lucretia of Mérida	306	23 November	Virgin Martyr
	Lucy and Geminian	c. 300	16 September	Martyrs
	Lucy of Syracuse	304	13 December	Virgin Martyr
	Ludger of Utrecht	809	26 March	Apostle of Saxony, first Bishop of Münster, Venerable; who founded Werden Abbey
	Ludmila of Bohemia	921	16 September	Martyr, Princess of Czechia; a.k.a. Ludmilla
	Luke of Novgorod	c. 1059	Third Sunday after Pentecost	Archbishop of Novgorod, Venerable; the first ethnic Russian to hold the position
	Luke of Steiris	953	7 February	Venerable Wonderworker; a.k.a. Luke the Younger, Luke Thaumaturgus and Luke of Hellas
	Luke the Evangelist	84–100	22 April / 18 October / 4 January	Evangelist, Apostle of the Seventy, Martyr; who wrote the Gospel of Luke and the Acts of the Apostles
	Luke the Stylite	c. 970	11 December	Venerable, Stylite
	Luke the Surgeon	1961	29 May	Bishop of Crimea, Wonderworker, Unmercenary Healer, Venerable Hieroconfessor, Blessed; a.k.a. Luke of Simferopol and Luke of Crimea; native name Luka Voyno-Yasenetsky
	Lullus of Mainz	786	16 October	Archbishop of Mainz, first Abbot of Hersfeld Abbey, Venerable, Benedictine monk; a.k.a. Lull and Lul
	Luxorius	303	21 August	Martyr
	Macarius of Alexandria	394–395	19 January	Church Father, Desert Father, Venerable; a.k.a. Macarius the Younger
	Macarius of Corinth	1805	17 April	Metropolitan of Corinth, Venerable
	Macarius of Jerusalem	c. 335	10 March	Patriarch of Jerusalem, Venerable; who fought against Arianism
	Macarius of Moscow	1563	30 December	Metropolitan of Moscow and all Rus', Venerable
	Macarius of Serbia	1574	12 September [O.S. 30 August]	13th Patriarch of Serbia (r. 1557–1571), Venerable; surnamed Sokolović
	Macarius of Unzha	1444	25 July	Hegumen of Zheltovod and Unzha, Venerable
	Macarius the Confessor	840	18 August	Hegumen of the Monastery of Pelekete, Venerable Confessor, iconodule' a.k.a. Macarius of Pelekete
	Macarius the Great	391	19 January	Church Father, Desert Father, Venerable; a.k.a. Macarius the Elder and Macarius of Egypt
	Macedonius II of Constantinople	c. 517	25 April	Patriarch of Constantinople, Venerable
	Macrina the Younger	379 / 380	19 July	Venerable, sister of St. Basil and St. Gregory
	Malachi	500–401 BC	3 January	Prophet; who wrote the Book of Malachi; a.k.a. Malachias
	Manasseh	c. 1550 BC – c. 1440 BC	Sunday of the Holy Forefathers	Patriarch, Righteous, son of Patriarch Joseph, founder of the half-tribe of Manasseh; a.k.a. Manasses and Menashe
	Manuel II Palaiologos	1425	21 July	Byzantine Emperor, Venerable
	Marcellinus of Rome	304	7 June	Patriarch of Rome, Venerable, possibly a hieromartyr
	Marcellus I of Rome	309	7 June	Patriarch of Rome, Venerable, Hieroconfessor
	Mardarius of Lješanska, Libertyville and All America	1935	12 December [O.S. 29 November]	First Serbian Orthodox Bishop of America and Canada, Venerable; native name Mardarije Uskoković
	Maria Romanova	1918	17 July	Passion bearer, one of the Romanov Martyrs
	Mark of the Caves	c. 1080 – c. 1120	29 December / 28 September	Venerable; a.k.a. Mark the Grave-digger
	Mark of Ephesus	1444	19 January	Church Father, Pillar of Orthodoxy, Archbishop of Ephesus, Venerable Hesychast; who rejected the uniate Council of Basel-Ferrara-Florence
	Mark of Rome	336	7 October	Patriarch of Rome, Venerable
	Mark the Evangelist	68	25 April	Apostle of the Seventy, first Patriarch of Alexandria, Evangelist, Hieromartyr; who wrote the Gospel of Mark
	Martha of Bethany	33–100	4 June / Sunday of the Holy Myrrhbearers	Myrrhbearer, sister of St. Lazarus
	Martin of Braga	580	20 March	Apostle to the Suevi, Church Father, Bishop of Mondoñedo and Braga, Venerable; a.k.a. Martin of Dumio
	Martin of Tours	397	12 October	Church Father, Bishop of Tours, Venerable, Military Saint; who opposed Arianism and Priscillianism
	Martin of Vertou	601	24 October	Venerable; who founded the Monastery of Vertou
	Martin of Vienne	c. 132	1 July	Bishop of Vienne, Venerable
	Martin the Confessor	655	14 April	Patriarch of Rome, Venerable Hieromartyr, Hieroconfessor
	Martina of Rome	228	30 January	Martyr
	Mary of Nazareth	c. 57	25 March / 15 August / 8 September / 21 November	The Most Holy Mother of God (Theotokos, Bogorodica), Queen of Heaven, Panagia, Holy Virgin, New Eve, Our Lady, Immaculate, Most Pure, Blessed
	Mary of Bethany	33–100	4 June / Sunday of the Holy Myrrhbearers	Myrrhbearer, sister of St. Lazarus
	Mary of Clopas	33–100	23 May / Sunday of the Holy Myrrhbearers	Myrrhbearer, wife of Clopas, daughter of St. Joseph
	Mary Magdalene	33–100	22 July / Sunday of the Holy Myrrhbearers	Equal-to-the-Apostles, Myrrhbearer
	Mary of Egypt	421	4 April	Venerable, Ascetic
	Mary of Paris	1945	20 July	Righteous, Martyr; a.k.a. Maria Skobtsova and Mother Maria
	Matrona of Moscow	1952	7 March / 19 April	Unmercenary Healer, Wonderworker, Righteous, Blessed, native name Matrona Nikonova
	Matthew the Evangelist	c. 68	16 November / 30 June	Apostle, Evangelist, Martyr; who wrote the Gospel of Matthew
	Matthias the Apostle	63	9 August / 30 June	Apostle, Martyr; who replaced the position of Judas Iscariot after his suicide
	Maurice of Agaunum	287	22 February / 22 September / 27 December	Martyr, leader of the Theban Legion, Military Saint; a.k.a. Moritz, Morris, or Mauritius
	Maximianus of Constantinople	434	21 April	Archbishop of Constantinople, Venerable; a.k.a. Maximian
	Maximilian of Antioch	c. 353	21 August	Martyr
	Maximilian of Lorch	284	12 October	Archbishop of Laureacum, Missionary, Venerable Hieromartyr; who founded the church of Lorch, Austria
	Maximilian of Tebessa	295	12 March	Martyr; who was martyred for refusing to do military service
	Maximus III of Constantinople	1482	17 November	Ecumenical Patriarch of Constantinople, Venerable
	Maximus of Gorlice	1914	6 September	Hieromartyr, protomartyr of the Lemko people
	Maximus of Kiev	1305	6 December	Metropolitan of Kiev and all Rus', Venerable
	Maximus of Turin	465	25 June	Church Father, Bishop of Turin, Venerable
	Maximus of Ungro-Wallachia	1516	31 January [O.S. 18 January]	Metropolitan of Belgrade, Metropolitan of Ungro-Wallachia, Venerable, Despot of Serbia; who founded Krušedol Monastery; birth name Đorđe Branković
	Maximus the Confessor	662	21 January / 13 August	Theologian, Church Father, Venerable Confessor; a.k.a. Maximus the Theologian and Maximus of Constantinople
	Maximus the Greek	1556	21 January	Venerable
	Meletius of Antioch	381	12 February	Church Father, Patriarch of Antioch, Bishop of Sebaste, Venerable; who fought against Arianism
	Meletius I Pegas	1601	13 September	Patriarch of Alexandria, Venerable
	Mellitus of Canterbury	624	24 April	Archbishop of Canterbury, Bishop of London, Abbot, Venerable
	Micah	c. 730 BC	14 August	Prophet; who wrote the Book of Micah; a.k.a. Micheas
	Melchizedek	c. 1933 BC – c. 1800 BC	22 May / Sunday of the Holy Forefathers	High Priest of Israel, Righteous, King of Salem
	Melito of Sardis	180	1 April	Church Father, Bishop of Sardis, Venerable
	Menas of Egypt	304	11 November	Great Martyr, Military Saint, name also spelled Minas, Mena, Mina and Meena
	Mesrop the Translator	c. 439	17 February / 19 February	Priest, linguist and translator; who created the Armenian alphabet and Caucasian Albanian script; widely known as Mesrop Mashtots
	Methodius I of Constantinople	847	14 June	Ecumenical Patriarch of Constantinople, Venerable; name also written as Methodios
	Methodius of Olympus	c. 311	20 June	Church Father, Bishop of Olympus and Patara, Venerable Hieromartyr
	Methodius of Thessaloniki	885	11 May	Equal-to-the-Apostles, Teacher and Enlightener of the Slavs, Bishop of Sirmium, Venerable, Hieroconfessor, brother of St. Cyril
	Metrophanes of Byzantium	326	4 June	Bishop of Byzantium, Venerable
	Metrophanes of China	1900	11 June	New Hieromartyr, leader of the 222 Chinese Martyrs, protomartyr of China
	Metrophanes of Voronezh	1703	23 November	Bishop of Voronezh, Venerable
	Michael the Archangel	N/A (Note: According to Christian theology, angels do not die.)	8 November	Archangel, Taxiarch
	Michael of Chernigov	1246	20 September	Right-Believing, Confessor, Martyr, Grand Prince of Kiev, Prince of Novgorod, native name Mikhail Vsevolodovich
	Michael I of Kiev	992	15 June	Metropolitan of Kiev and all Rus', Venerable
	Michael of Klopsk	1456	11 January	Fool for Christ, Venerable
	Michael of Tver	1318	22 November	Right-Believing, Martyr, Prince of Tver, native name Mikhail Yaroslavich
	Milburga of Wenlock	715	23 February	Abbess of Wenlock, Venerable, Healer, name also spelled Milburgh and Mildburh
	Milica of Serbia	1405	12 September [O.S. 30 August] (Serbian Orthodox); 1 August [O.S. 19 July] (Russian Orthodox)	Right-Believing, Hegumenia of Ljubostinja Monastery, which she founded, Venerable, Tsaritsa of Serbia; first tonsured as Jevgenija and later Jefrosina
	Milutin	1321	12 November [O.S. 30 October]	Right-Believing, King of Serbia, Ktetor; regnal name Stefan Uroš II
	Miltiades of Rome	314	10 December	Patriarch of Rome, Venerable, who reigned when Christianity was legalised in the Roman empire and who fought against Donatism
	Miriam	c. 1500 BC – c. 1301 BC	Sunday of the Holy Forefathers	Prophetess, Righteous, older sister of Prophets Moses and Aaron
	Mirian III of Iberia	361	1 October	Equal-to-the-Apostles, King of Georgia
	Modestus of Carantania	c. 720 – c. 772	5 February	Apostle of Carantania, Bishop of Carantania, Venerable
	Modestus of Trier	489	24 February	Bishop of Trier, Venerable
	Moses	1569 BC	4 September / Sunday of the Holy Forefathers	God-seer, Prophet, brother of Prophet Aaron and Prophetess Miriam; who wrote the Pentateuch and Psalm 89 (90)
	Moses of Arabia	c. 389	7 February	Apostle of the Saracens, Bishop of Arabia, Venerable
	Moses the Black	405	28 August	Desert Father, Venerable Hieromartyr, Hieromonk; a.k.a. Moses the Strong, Moses the Robber, Moses the Abyssinian and Moses the Ethiopian
	Moses the Hungarian	1043	26 July	Venerable, the Hungarian
	Moses of Novgorod	1362	25 January / 19 April	Bishop of Novgorod, Venerable
	Mstislav I of Kiev	1132	15 April	Right-Believing, Grand Prince of Kiev; a.k.a. Mstislav the Great
	Mstislav Rostislavich of Smolensk	1180	14 June	Right-Believing, Prince of Novgorod; a.k.a. Mstislav the Brave

== See also ==
- List of Eastern Orthodox saint titles
- List of saints in the Russian Orthodox Church
- List of saints of the Serbian Orthodox Church
- List of American Orthodox saints
