= John of Valamo =

Monk of New Valamo monastery

Saint Schema-Igumen John
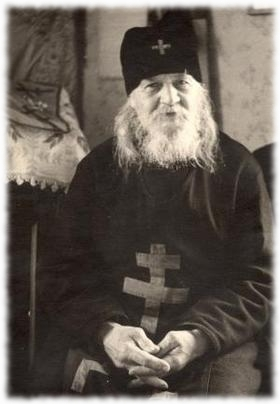

Venerable John of Valamo
- Born: 26 February 1873 village Gubka, Novotorzhsky Uyezd, Tver Governorate, Russian Empire
- Died: 5 June 1958 (aged 85); New Valamo, Finland
- Venerated in: Eastern Orthodox Church
- Canonized: 29 November 2018 (added to the Hagiologion); 31 May and 1 June 2019 (Feast of canonization), New Valamo Monastery, Heinävesi, Finland by Ecumenical Patriarchate of Constantinople
- Feast: 5 June

Schema-Igumen John (Russian: Схиигумен Иоанн, Finnish: Skeemaigumeeni Johannes, born Ivan Alekseyevich Alekseyev, Russian: Иван Алексеевич Алексеев; 26 February 1873, village Gubka, Novotorzhsky Uyezd, Tver Governorate, Russian Empire – 5 June 1958, New Valamo, Heinävesi, Finland), canonized as St. John of Valamo (Finnish: Johannes Valamolainen, Russian: Иоанн Валаамский), was a monk in both Old Valamo and New Valamo and the head of the Petsamo Monastery. Some of his letters, containing many pieces of spiritual advice have been published in English in a book called Christ in Our Midst. Letters from a Russian Monk.

== Origins and early monastic life ==
=== Early life ===
Fr. John was born to a peasant family in Russia in the Tver Guberniya on 26 February 1873, and his lay name was Ivan Alekseevich Alekseev. The family consisted of the parents and a sister and two brothers, in addition to Ivan.

Young Ivan learned to read, taught by a tailor who visited his house and worked on furs there. In his own memoirs, he said he was not a very good student and that his sister learned the Russian letters before him, but in the end he, too, learned to read. Ivan soon developed a liking to reading and acquired Lives of the Saints, published as small booklets. Together with his parents, he often visited e.g. the famous Volokolamsk Monastery. There the idea took root in his mind that he, too, would come to live in a monastery.

=== A hard school for future life ===
At the age of thirteen, Ivan Alekseev left home and went to St. Petersburg and began to work in a bar owned by his elder brother; there he would see the dark side of the human nature in all its wretchedness. He said much later, that for a future spiritual guide, there would not have been a better place to get acquainted with the joys and sorrows of human life, especially with its agony and anxiety.

In St. Petersburg he bought many new books.

=== The call of the monastic life prevails ===
From St. Petersburg, life took young Ivan through the Konevets Monastery to the Valamo Monastery, where in 1889 at the age of 16, he became a novice. He stayed there for four years, but then he was conscripted to the Russian Army, where he spent four years serving in a sharpshooter battalion. After that he lived with his father for two years and then returned to Valamo in 1900.

In 1907 he became a member of the brotherhood, and in 1910 he was tonsured a monk and given a new name, Brother Iakinf, after the Greek martyr Yakinthos (Hyacinth, d. 98 A.D.).

Brother Iakinf served the monastery eagerly, but a two-year assignment to the monastery's podvor’e in St. Petersburg was difficult for him. Iakinf took it with obedience and upon returning to Valamo, he was given a reward: he was assigned to the St. John the Baptist Skete, of which he had dreamed, a place known for its strenuous life of fasting and profound prayer. There he spent six years, working hard and praying, as an assistant to the hermit monks and as their fellow prayer.

Iakinf was happy at the skete, as he loved its peace and quiet. He also appreciated the guidance in spiritual life written by holy fathers who had contended through the centuries. This literature was his favourite reading, most of all Philokalia. The peace of the skete provided a good setting for immersing oneself in these writings.

The Independence of Finland and the Controversy concerning chronology in the Finnish Orthodox Church did not affect this place of calm and prayer.

== A hard and difficult assignment in the far north ==
On 19 October 1921 Brother Iakinf was assigned to the Pechenga Monastery, as its igumen. The choice of Brother Iakinf was surprising, as he was an ordinary monk. In the space of a short time, he was consecrated as a deacon and then a priest. He was given two weeks to prepare for the new assignment and to learn how to conduct the divine services.

This task was a hard and a difficult one, but Igumen Iakinf stayed there for ten years, without a murmur. Compared to Valamo, the monks in Petsamo were quite uneducated, and spiritual guidance and teaching literacy were the most challenging tasks of the new igumen. However, Iakinf would find that the brethren were hard working and diligent, but spiritual life had remained somewhat alien to them, which could be seen in their missing services and in their lack of knowledge of spiritual literature. Iakinf pointed these things out to the brethren and was able to achieve a change in these things.

However, in 1924 he experienced problems, due to which he considered leaving the monastery. He reprimanded the brethren, when the monk Aleksei had told him he should not have a Lapp man live at the monastery. He also called to their attention that monk Anatoli had sworn during haymaking and that the latter had told his father confessor to shut up when he had reprimanded him. In addition to this, he had to call to the attention of the brethren that they missed services regularly and that various sales and building projects had been initiated without his blessing. He thus considered that his position as the head of the monastery had been undermined and that he was unworthy to lead it, and he therefore announced that he would return to Valamo. However, all of the brethren begged him to stay, which he ended up doing.

Living in the far north he was still very far from the controversy concerning chronology, which did not really concern the Petsamo Monastery at all, since the monastery had already earlier decided to use the Gregorian calendar.

=== Returning home ===
In October 1931, Fr. John asked to be relieved of his position in Petsamo, and he was now able to return to Valamo, where he was tonsured to the Great Schema and given a new name: he was now known as Schema-Igumen John.

The new Schema-Igumen was allowed to return to his beloved St. John the Baptist Skete to continue his monastic life. Even there he was not totally alienated from the world: one summer he had an assistant there, a young novice by the name of Georgi, who later became a hieromonk and in 1955 vicar bishop, and finally in 1960, Archbishop of Karelia and All Finland. The old hermit and the young novice became fast friends.

Father John was able to rejoice and see his young friend become a vicar bishop, but not rise to the office of archbishop, although he could anticipate it – every Orthodox Christian in the country could see that the old and frail Archbishop Herman was preparing his young protégé to become his successor, only this was not being talked about.

The number of the monastics was dwindling in Valamo, as it was cut off from Russia and no new members of brethren could come from there. He now had to move to the main monastery for the winters, acting there as an assistant to the father confessor from 1937 on. In this position he made some friends for life. The most memorable of these confession children was Jelena Armfelt from Helsinki, with whom he then had an extensive correspondence.

== In exile ==
=== Taking new root ===
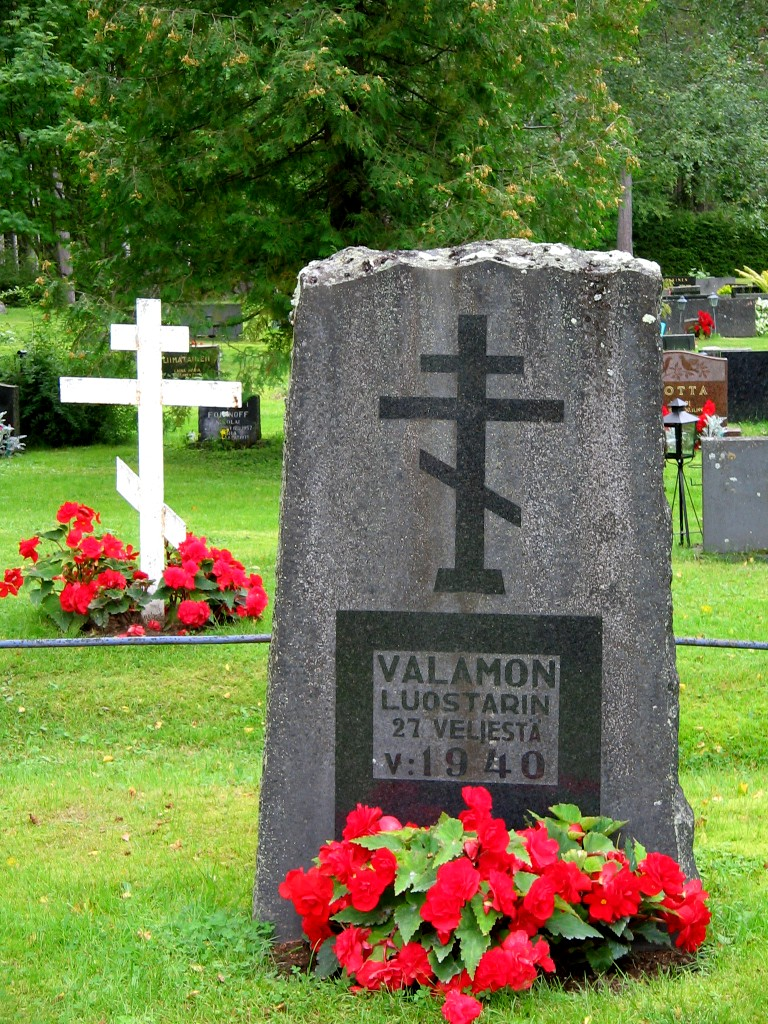
A monument for 27 monks who died in Kannonkoski, Central Finland, where the monastery was evacuated before settling to Heinävesi.

The difficult days of the Winter War arrived in Valamo, including the people of the St. John the Baptist Skete. They all had to be evacuated from Valamo. When the monastery was being bombed during the war, Fr. John had sat calmly in his cell and read the Gospel, not minding the windows being broken and the doors swinging open due to the blasts from exploding bombs. During the hasty evacuation, he took along mainly spiritual literature, and later he lamented not having been able to take with him the two icons on his wall, one of which he had received from his parents.

The elderly hermit showed an example to his younger monastic brethren, and he helped to make the difficult time easier for them. Later father confessor, Hieromonk Savva (Stepan Savinski), who had been appointed responsible for the evacuation, said in the 1970s that Fr. John's quiet dignity made it easy to lead the evacuation. The Vuoskoski school at Kannonkoski was the first destination for the evacuated monks; while living there six of the old monks died. A monument was erected for them at the Kannonkoski cemetery.

A new and permanent home for the elderly monks was found in Papinniemi, Heinävesi. This was a deserted mansion that belonged to a company called Saastamoinen, which was purchased for the monastery.

Fr. John became very fond of the new home in exile, and he condemned any longing for Lake Ladoga as "temptation to sin". In a letter to one of his confession children he said that he no longer even thinks of [Old] Valamo.

In New Valamo in Heinävesi he was made an elder, to whom were sent the rare new novices and others who needed guidance and spiritual help. He was given his own room in a large barrack like building, in its eastern end, upstairs, and there he lived almost to the end of his life.

After his death, the same room became the permanent residence of the father confessor, until the new house for the monks was completed. During three decades, many hundreds of people coming to confessions knocked on its door and said the Jesus prayer and thus asked for permission to enter, which they were granted when they heard the word "Amen" from the room.

=== Difficult moments ===
In the summer of 1947, the head of the monastery who had led it during the evacuation, Igumen Hariton (Dunaev) was tonsured to the Great Schema, but his time in this capacity was short, as he was ill with an advanced form of cancer, which claimed him in October the same year.

Fr. John was appointed the new head of the monastery, but the church administration did not confirm the appointment, as a person tonsured into the Great Schema could not be elected a head of a monastery. This position was given to Hieromonk Ieronim, who died five years later. His successor was Hieromonk Nestor, before this the treasurer of the monastery, who held this position for 15 years.

=== Spiritual counsel ===
In 1948, the last father confessor of Old Valamo, Schema Igumen Yefrem, who had lived in the Smolensk Skete, died, and now Fr. John was given this position, in which he stayed until his death in 1958.

Fr. John had a lively correspondence with this confession children, and for many of them his letters were a source of great comfort in the midst of grief, trials and tribulations. During the days of need after the war, these people sent him food, for which he was deeply grateful.

One of these confession children was Tito Colliander, who describes his confessor in the book Ateria (‘The Dinner’), which appeared in 1975. In the book one can find a grim picture of what it meant to be an Orthodox monk in the post-war Finland.

=== The hermit becomes a published writer ===
While Fr. John was still alive, a book of his letters to his confession children was published. Hieromonk Paul, who was the editor-in-chief of the magazine Aamun Koitto in the early 1950s, translated some of these letters into Finnish and published them in the magazine. These beautiful letters were so well received that in 1953, the idea then came up of publishing them in a book form. After many difficulties, the book was published in Russian in 1956 as duplicates from typed pages with the title "Letters from a Valamo elder". When the idea of having a cover done by Ina Colliander did not work out, Fr. John drew a picture for the cover himself. The readers received the book favourably, but in Valamo, the reception was sour and even hostile. Fr. John commented on this himself:

In general, the letter mortifies the soul among the Valamo monks. This book will be a hindrance to those monks, who see the only thing that is necessary. This had not been written to condemn anyone, but the monks’ notions have become more obvious than before.

The book was published in Finnish in 1976, and as before, the texts were translated and edited by Archbishop Paul. However, a new cover was devised: a stylized image of the main monastery in Lake Ladoga, and above it, a black and white photograph of Fr. John. The Valamo Monastery has issued the book again at least three times, in 1992, 2008 and 2012.

The book has also been published in English with the title Christ in Our Midst. Letters from a Russian Monk, in England in 1979 and in the United States in 1980, translated from the Russian texts that had appeared in Paris in a journal called L’Eternel (Vechnoe).

New editions in Russian have been published in Russia at least in 1997, 2004, 2006, 2007, 2010, 2013, and 2016. It has reportedly also been published in Armenian. His biography has been published originally in Finnish in 1985 and then in Russian in 2006 and 2009.

=== Death ===
On 5 June 1958, novice Andrei Peschkoff was going to a local grocery store and went to Fr. John to ask him if he needed anything from the store. The elder sat quietly in his bed and did not answer. Peschkoff was frightened and went to fetch Hieromonk Gabriel, who could see that Fr. John was dead.

Many of the confession children were present at Fr. John's funeral, most notably Tito Colliander, together with his family, and Klaudia Korelin ja Jelena Armfelt. The funeral was conducted by Archbishop Herman, the last of such tasks he would perform.

=== Memory of the beloved spiritual guide ===
Jelena Armfelt kept all the letters of guidance she had received from Fr. John, and turned them over to the head of the Valamo Monastery, Igumen Panteleimon. He read the letters through carefully and decided that based on them and the archives of the monastery one could write a decent biography of the Valamo elder, whose letters and teaching were loved, but who had remained a distant figure. The book was published in 1985 by the monastery.

On 5 June 2008, a memorial service was conducted at his grave, on the occasion of the 50th anniversary of his death.

== Canonization ==
Fr. John's name came up when the Synod of Bishops of the Finnish Orthodox Church considered Finns for a possible canonization. In March 2016, the synod of bishops of the Finnish Orthodox Church made a proposal on the canonization of Fr. John and Johannes Karhapää. On 29 November 2018, the Holy Synod of the Ecumenical Patriarchate of Constantinople "recorded in the Hagiologion of the Orthodox Church" the two proposed names. His feast of canonization was held at New Valamo Monastery, Heinävesi, Finland 31 May and 1 June 2019.

== Books ==
=== Book in English ===
- Christ is in Our Midst. Letters from a Russian Monk. Darton, Longman and Todd Ltd., London, England, 1979, and St. Vladimir's Seminary Press, Crestwood, NY, 1980 (second printing in Crestwood, 1996). Originally published in Russian in Vechnoe (‘L’Eternel’), Paris, 1961.
- Archimandrite Panteleimon. A Star in the Heavens. The Life of Father John of Valamo. Valamo Monastery, Heinävesi, Finland, 1991. ISBN 951-9468-44-7

=== Books in Finnish ===
- Valamon vanhuksen kirjeitä. Translated by Archbishop Paul.2nd printing 1976, 3rd printing 1978; 4th printing 2012 (Valaam Monastery) [‘Letters of a Valaam elder’.]. Porvoo, Helsinki: WSOY. 1976. p. [1], 199. ISBN 951-0-07802-6.
- Kirjeitä Jelenalle: skeemaigumeni Johanneksen kirjeitä Jelena Armfeltille vuosilta 1945–1958.Translated by Archbishop Paul, Metropolitan Panteleimon, Sergius Colliander. ISSN 0356-2085 [‘Letters to Yelena. Letters of Schema-igumen John to Yelena Armfelt from 1945–1958’]. Heinävesi: Valaam Monastery. 2017. p. [12], 179. ISBN 978-952-5495-34-8.
- Kirjeitä Innalle: skeemaigumeni Johanneksen kirjeitä Ina Collianderille vuosilta 1947–1957. Translated by Sergius Colliander. ISSN 0356-2085 [‘Letters to Inna. Letters of Schema-igumen John to Ina Colliander from 1947–1957’]. Heinävesi: Valaam Monastery. 2014. p. 168. ISBN 978-952-5495-34-8.
- Luostarivanhuksen kirjeitä. Translated by Metropolitan Panteleimon. ISSN 0356-2085 [‘Letters from a monastery elder’]. Heinävesi: Valaam Monastery. 2018. p. 223. ISBN 978-952-5495-54-6.

=== Book in Russian ===
- Письма валаамского старца. Friends of Valamo (Finland), 1984.

== Sources ==
- Igumeni Panteleimon: Isä Johannes – Valamon Vanhuksen skeemaigumeni Johanneksen (1874–1958) elämäkerta. (‘Fr. John — biography of Schema-Igumen John(1874–1958)’.) Valamo Monastery, 1985.
- Johannes, skeemaigumeeni: Valamon vanhuksen kirjeitä, translated into Finnish by Archbishop Paul. Heinävesi, Valamon luostari, 1992.
