= Of Pskov =

Toponymic epithet

Of Pskov is a toponymic epithet associated the Principality of Pskov or the city Pskov. Notable people with this epithet include:

- Daumantas of Pskov
- Euphrosynus of Pskov
- John of Pskov
- Olga of Pskov
- Nicholas Salos of Pskov
- Philotheus of Pskov ( 1465 – 1542), hegumen of the Yelizarov Monastery, near Pskov
- Vsevolod of Pskov

== See also ==
- Prince of Pskov
