= Johannes Karhapää =

Finnish Karelian teacher and Eastern Orthodox saint (1884–1918)

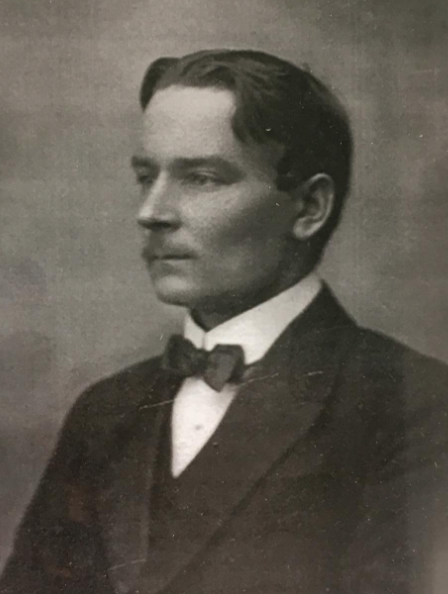

St. John of Sonkajanranta
- Born: July 13, 1884; Ilomantsi, Grand Duchy of Finland
- Died: 7 or 8 March 1918 (aged 33); Joensuu, Finland
- Venerated in: Eastern Orthodox Church
- Canonized: 29 November 2018 (added to the Hagiologion); 12-13 July 2019 (Feast of canonization), Sonkajanranta, Joensuu, Finland by Ecumenical Patriarchate of Constantinople
- Feast: 8 March

Johannes Vasilinpoika Karhapää (or Ivan Vasilievich Karhapää, Russian: Иван Васильевич Кархапя; 13 July 1884 – 7 or 8 March 1918,) was a Finnish Karelian teacher and an Eastern Orthodox missionary who was killed by the White Guards during the Finnish Civil War. He was canonized in 2018 as the Holy Martyr and Confessor John of Sonkajanranta.

== Life ==
=== Early life ===
Karhapää was born in the Sonkajanranta village at the Nissinen homestead in Ilomantsi. His parents were Vasili and Anastasia Karhapää. He had a younger brother Jaakko and two half brothers, Feodor and Ilja. He married Katri Timola and had two sons with her, Sergei, who died in infancy, and Aleksi. However, the wife died in 1910, and Karhapää married again, this time to Anna Palviainen.

=== Activities as an enlightener ===
During his childhood, he developed a strong Orthodox faith, and he participated in the activities of the local youth association of the Saints Sergius and Herman Brotherhood. At the turn of the century, the Sortavala Evangelical Society had initiated a fanatical campaign to convert Orthodox Christians to the Lutheran faith, and as a countermeasure, the Karelian Brotherhood was founded in Olonets in 1907, at the initiative of Hieromonk, future Vicar Bishop Cyprian (Shnitnikov). The brotherhood quickly established dozens of Russian language schools in Karelia and published study materials for these schools. The schools became quite popular, partly due to social benefits offered to the student. The original purpose of the brotherhood was to engage itself in vigorous domestic mission work, but during the reign of Governor-general Franz Albert Seyn in 1909–1917, the Karelian Brotherhood was harnessed for the purposes of Russification of Karelia.

Karhapää also got worried about the growing Lutheran mission work in his home area, and in 1906, he approached Archbishop Sergius of Finland (later patriarch of Moscow) in a letter. He asked for help in defending Orthodoxy and expressed a wish to have a school in Sonkajanranta. As a result of Karhapää's activity, an association called Orthodox Association was founded in Sonkajanranta, as a subdivision of the Saints Sergei and Herman Brotherhood. The archbishop gave his blessing to the association to found an Orthodox church school together with the Karelian Brotherhood. A school was built in Sonkajanranta the following year, with the Finnish language as the medium of instruction. By 1911, the school operated four classes. Poor students as well as those coming from farther away had a possibility to live and dine at the school, and the school was also used to house teaching, enlightenment and festive occasions for the adult population.

Working for the Saints Sergei and Herman Brotherhood, Karhapää also engaged himself as a catechist in Ilomantsi, going around with Hieromonk Isaaki of the Valamo Monastery, selling prints and literature and conducting popular Christian events, and in 1914 the Viipuri Spiritual Consistory appointed the self-taught Karhapää to be a religion teacher for the entire Kuopio Province, with his salary being paid for by the Grand Duchy of Finland. Karhapää's activity was the greatest from the beginning of World War I. However, at the same time he accumulated more and more enemies, and he was labelled as henchman of the tsarist regime and even a spy employed by the Okhrana.

The situation of the Sonkajanranta school became more difficult when Vicar Bishop Kiprian died in 1914 and the Karelian Brotherhood was paralyzed. However, the following year the St. Petersburg merchant Nesteror donated 10 000 roubles to the school and to the building of a church next to it. The church was completed in the autumn of 1915 and consecrated to the memory of Anna the Prophetess. The blueprint for the church was drawn by monk Gennadi from the Valamo Monastery. The church was not under the jurisdiction of the Ilomantsi Orthodox Parish but under that of the Karelian Brotherhood.

Karhapää's input in the school and church projects was significant, and because of his exemplary activities in church and enlightenment work, he received a number of distinctions. However, new malicious rumours were circulated about him, and his activities aroused much hatred among the local Fennomen, as he was considered to be a propagator of the ″Russian faith″ (Finnish: ″Ryssän usko″, the word ryssä being racist slur for Russian). He was especially hated for having in 1912 received Governor-general Seyn at his home. During the visit Seyn had advised Karhapää to apply for funds from the government so that a proper road could be constructed to the school. After the Russian Revolution in 1917, accusations against Karhapää intensified, and he was called a henchman of the tsarist regime and a snoop and a Bolshevist. It was even said that he had an influence on who would be appointed priests in his home region. It was also known that Karhapää was a supporter of the Tsar.

=== In trouble in the 1910s ===
Karhapää had been slandered and calumniated in many ways since 1910. At that time the Kemi newspaper Perä-Pohjolainen claimed that Karhapää and his father were in favour of the Russian anti-Finnish policies and called them “miserable Finns”.

After the Russian Revolution, the slandering became more intense. In the Fennoman papers of North Karelia, e.g. in Karjalan Sanomat, he was called “one of the dark powers of North Karelia”, and his mission travels and his decorations were made fun of. It was claimed that he sowed hatred and discord among the Karelian population, which according to the claims was not properly aware of its true faith and ethnicity. In addition to this, he was called a strong and ruthless advocate of Russification, who supposedly wanted to lead all Finns into subjugation to Russia. It was also claimed that he considered himself to be a martyr and that he caused fear in the local population and that he ridiculed the Christian faith and other sacred things and that he deceived simple persons. Similar accusations were levelled at his father and brother. However, Karhapää himself did not answer these accusations and slandering. According to professor of Church history Kauko Pirinen, this criticism was untoward, since Karhapää's only motivation was his deep religious conviction.

Finally he began to be opposed among the Orthodox faithful as well. Just before Easter 1917, a meeting of the people of the Ilomantsi Orthodox Parish condemned Karhapää and the Sonkajanranta school as non-national oppression, which was mixed with religion. It was demanded that Karhapää be dismissed from his positions of positions of trust and from the parish council. In the autumn of 1917, he also lost the support of Archbishop Serafim, and he was dismissed from his position as a teacher. The schools of the Karelian Brotherhood in Ladoga Karelia were turned over to the local municipalities, in Sonkajanranta in the autumn of 1917, a fierce nationalist Jäger from near by Kovero became its teacher. When Karhapää soon after this lost the support of Archbishop Serafim, he became practically an outlaw in the turmoil of the Finnish Civil War.

=== Imprisonment and death ===
In March 1918, Karhapää and his brother Jaakko were ordered to the call-up of the White Guards to the Tuupovaara Primary School. There they were arrested on the basis of a tip-off. An incriminating piece of evidence was a small icon, found in the pocket of Karhapää's coat, intended for use school instruction. Karhapää was allowed to visit his home and bid farewell to his family, but then he was taken to Joensuu, at gunpoint. During a stop at a nearby house, Karhapää told the lady of the house that his days were numbered. In Joensuu Karhapää and his brother were locked up in the basement of the Joensuu Town Hall together with other prisoners, mainly Red Guard and Russian POW's.

In early March 1918, Karhapää was taken to the Siilainen neighbourhood of Joensuu, where he was executed. At the time, executions were carried out randomly and without a trial, the executioners often being drunk. The local military districts were unable to curb the White Guards’ urge to carry out executions. Karhapää and the others to be executed were ordered in a row, and five executioners fired a volley. It is said that Karhapää did not die instantly, and another volley was needed to finish him off. In his tombstone, the date of death is given as August 8.

In the database War Victims of Finland 1914–1922, the date of Karhapää's death is recorded as March 7. However, according to other data, he would have been executed some three weeks later, around Easter, and according to yet other data, only on 14 April together with 99 Russians taken prisoners during the Battle of Rautu.

Karhapää's wife tried to obtain her husband's body, but she only succeeded after months had passed since his death. The body was identified from the stripes of the woollen socks. Karhapää was buried at the Kokonniemi cemetery in Ilomantsi, with a large group of people attending, including both Orthodox and Lutheran Christians.

The slandering talk and writings continued even after his death, and the tombstone on his grave was twice thrown into nearby lake. Finally it was cast in concrete.

In 1958, an old man came to Karhapää's brother Jaakko, clothed in a frieze coat. He told him that he was one of the executioners. The old and sickly man suffered from a guilty conscience. Jaakko Karhapää had a conversation with the man and allowed him to stay the night at his house.

== Canonization ==
Johannes Karhapää's name came up when the Synod of Bishops of the Finnish Orthodox Church considered Finns for a possible canonization. In March 2016, the synod of bishops of the Finnish Orthodox Church made a proposal on the canonization of Johannes Karhapää and Schema-Igumen John of Valamo. On 29 November 2018, the Holy Synod of the Ecumenical Patriarchate of Constantinople “recorded in the Hagiologion of the Orthodox Church” the two proposed names. His liturgical canonization was held 12–13 July 2019 in Church of Anna the Prophetess in Sonkajanranta. His annual feast is 8 March.

== Additional information ==
A documentary film on Karhapää was aired by Yle in 2008, entitled “The Rise and Fall of an Orthodox Man”, directed by Mikko Keinonen. A book written by Liisa Pajukaarre was also due to appear the same year, but the publication was cancelled.

After the Independence of Finland, the Sonkajanranta school was given over to the local municipality. It burned down in the 1950s, and many items that had belonged to Karhapää were destroyed. The church of Anna the Prophetess is now one of the churches of the Joensuu Orthodox Parish.
