= List of Eastern Orthodox archbishops of Finland =

List of Eastern Orthodox archbishops of Finland, primates of the Orthodox Church of Finland:

No.	Portrait	Name (Birth–Death)	Term of office			Seat	Church
No.	Portrait	Name (Birth–Death)	Took office	Left office		Seat	Church
1		Antonij (Vadkovsky) (1846–1912)	1892	1898	6 years	Vyborg	Russian Orthodox Church
2		Nikolaj (Nalimov) (1852–1914)	1899	1905	6 years	Vyborg	Russian Orthodox Church
3		Sergius (Stragorodsky) (1867–1944)	1905	1917	12 years	Vyborg	Russian Orthodox Church
4		Seraphim (Lukjanov) (1879–1959)	1921	1923	2 years	Vyborg	Russian Orthodox Church
4		Seraphim (Lukjanov) (1879–1959)	1921	1923	2 years	Vyborg	Finnish Orthodox Church
5		Herman (Aav) (1878–1961)	1925	1960	35 years	Sortavala	Finnish Orthodox Church
5		Herman (Aav) (1878–1961)	1925	1960	35 years	Kuopio	Finnish Orthodox Church
6		Paul (Olmari) (1914–1988)	1960	1987	26 years	Kuopio	Finnish Orthodox Church
7		John (Rinne) (1923–2010)	15 October 1987	1 October 2001	13 years, 351 days	Kuopio	Finnish Orthodox Church
8		Leo (Makkonen) (1948–)	25 October 2001	1 December 2024	23 years, 37 days	Kuopio	Finnish Orthodox Church
8		Leo (Makkonen) (1948–)	25 October 2001	1 December 2024	23 years, 37 days	Helsinki	Finnish Orthodox Church
9		Elia (Wallgrén) (1961–)	1 December 2024	Incumbent	1 year, 348 days	Helsinki	Finnish Orthodox Church
