= Irene of Chrysobalanton =

Byzantine saint and hegumenia (fl. 9th century)

Saint Irene of Chrysobalanton
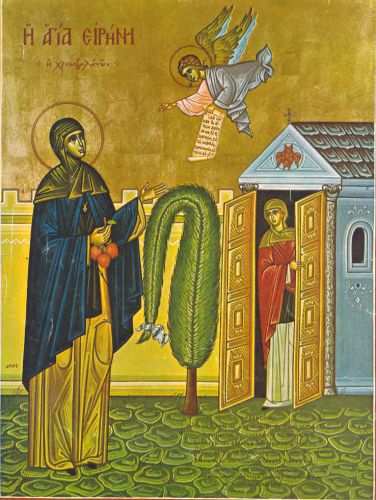
- Honored in: Eastern Orthodox Church
- Feast: July 28

Saint Irene of Chrysobalanton (Greek: Ειρήνη η Χρυσοβαλάντου; ca. 830/845 – ca. 930/940 CE), also known as Irene of Chrysovalantou and Irene Chrysovolantou of Cappadocia, was a Byzantine abbess (also known as hegumenia), deaconess and saint. Irene was born in Cappadocia to an imperial family, but lived most of her life as Abbess of the Convent of Chrysobalanton in Constantinople. She died aged 97. Her feast day is celebrated on July 28 in the Eastern Orthodox liturgical calendar. What is known about St. Irene, comes from the hagiography written about her life: the Life of Irene of Chrysobalanton (BHG 952), composed in the late-tenth century. While the Life was written anonymously, it is theorised that the hagiographer of the Life of Irene was a woman, which is a rarity in Byzantium. Irene is remembered for her ascetic practice and her rise within the ecclesiastical hierarchy at a young age, both of which are associated more with male saints. The saint was awarded certain spiritual gifts due to her ascetism and her ability defeat the attacks of the Evil One. Such gifts include: the gift of sight, the ability to predict the future; and the performance of miracles, such as the healing of demonic possession. It is said that Irene was famous in her time, especially among elite women, who sought her out for spiritual guidance. After her death, Irene's coffin is said to have benefited those who sought peace. In the 1920s, the Cult of Irene resurfaced due to an icon painted by a monk called Nektarios in 1919. This Icon of Irene is reported to have miracles qualities.

== Life ==
What is known about Saint Irene comes from the hagiography written about her, which is estimated to have been composed towards the end of the tenth century CE. Using textual clues, Jan Olof Rosenqvist, the English translator of the Life, has suggested approximate birth and death dates of ca. 830 and ca. 930 CE; Alexander Kazhdan has also suggested the dates ca. 845 and ca. 940 CE. Saint Irene was born in Cappadocia in the Byzantine Empire to a wealthy family who held posts in the imperial court and were influential in Constantinople. The names of Irene's parents are never explicitly given in the text, but Rosenqvist's examination of the vita uncovered that her family name is Gouber, a prominent ninth-century aristocratic family. Irene had a sister, whose name is also omitted.

The Life has an unusual structure, rather than beginning with background on Irene's parents and the saint's birth and early life, it begins by narrating how two periods of Byzantine Iconoclasm were ended by Empress Irene in the eighth century CE and then by Empress Theodora in the ninth century CE. The text then shifts focus to a young Irene, who was as a prospective bride for the Emperor Michael III (842–867 CE); it was intended that she participate in a bride-show, organised by Micheal's mother, Theodora. On route to the bride-show in Constantinople, Irene insisted upon visiting the well known hermit Ioannikios at Mount Olympos, Bithynia (modern day Türkiye). Upon meeting her, the hermit predicted that she would become Abbess of the Convent Chrysobalanton (or Chrysovalantou) in Constantinople. Ioannikios said to her: "Welcome, Irene, servant of God! Hasten, my child, with joy to the Imperial City, hasten! The Convent of Chrysobalanton needs you to shepherd her virgins!". Irene was then late, missing the bride-show, therefore she was not chosen for Michael, yet was still offered an advantageous marriage. However, she chose instead to enter the monestary of Chysobalanton as a young woman. Her age is not specified, however her, almost, participation in a bride-show, suggests that the oldest she could have been was eighteen, but was likely even younger. Irene's sister, on the other hand, married Ceaser Bardas, Empress Theodora's brother and uncle of Emperor Michael III, whom the hagiographer described as: "a man otherwise worth nothing, all consumed by envy and rejoicing in robberies and murders.".

Irene excelled as a young ascetic and is said to have intensely studied the Divine Scripture, which points to her high level of education. She drew particular inspiration from the Lives of the Desert Fathers, especially that of Saint Arsenios; she sought permission to emulate his ascetic practice of "stand[ing] with his hands extended to the east, beginning at sunset, and to cease from standing when the rising sun shed light on his face.". As Irene was still within her first year at the convent, the abbess was initially reluctant to allow her to practice this ascetic method, however she eventually gave Irene permission, trusting that she was ready.

After three years at Chysobalanton, the devil is said to have been "grieved, distressed, and vexed" by the strength of Irene's spiritual resolve, so he tried, and failed, to tempt her with thoughts of her former luxurious and noble life. After a series of failed plots against Irene orchestrated by the "evil one", God saw Irene's spiritual strength and rewarded her with spiritual gifts: imperviousness to the devil's attacks; the ability to fight demons and to cure demonic possession; and "the power to guide the souls of many to the light of truth." As a result, word of Irene spread and she was sought out, particularly by elite women, for spiritual guidance.

On her deathbed, the Abbess of Chysobalanton declared Irene her successor. Irene, however, responded to this with humility by resisting the role, despite her fellow nuns' insistence. To resolve matters, the nuns of Chysobalanton sought guidance from Methodios I, the Patriarch of Constantinople, who confirmed the late-Abbess' decision to appoint Irene as the new Abbess (also referred to as hegumenia); therefore, fulfilling the hermit Ioannikios' prediction. At the same time as he promoted her to abbess, Methodios also "ordained Irene a deaconess of the Great Church." Valerie A. Karras contends that the "Great Church" refers to the Hagia Sophia. Irene was consecrated as abbess and ordained a deaconess at an unusually young age: the text infers that Irene was still in her early-to-mid twenties and had only been at the convent for a handful of years; and deaconesses were often widows, most commonly appointed between the ages of forty and sixty. Irene's "premature rise in the ecclesiastical heirarchy" is more commonly found in the Lives of male saints.

Irene lived a long life serving as Abbess of Chysobalanton, she acted as a spiritual guide to many, practiced great asceticism, used her gift of foresight, performed a series of miracles, including healing those possessed, successfully defeated the devil's attacks, and even intervened in political matters. Despite living to the age of ninety seven, it is said that "no sign of old age was seen in her: for the flower of virginity never fades." Irene predicted her own peaceful death.

== Sanctification & Spiritual Gifts ==
=== Ascetic Practice ===
Saint Irene is said to be one of few Byzantine female saints who is known for her ascetic practice. She is most remembered for standing still for hours and days at a time, while "she stretched her arms to heaven" in imitation of Saint Arsenios. The longest recorded period of time Irene stood still for is one week:

"Therefore, when she was to lower her hands, she was unable to draw her arms together by herself, since the elbows and the shoulders, in consequence of the severe stretching and the prolonged extension, resisted their natural flexibility. Calling for those among the sisters that were closest to her she received help, and one could hear the joints emit a terrible cracking."

The saint practiced fasting too, both as part of her weekly routine, and in more extreme forms during religious festivals, such as the forty days of lent. Such fasting and water deprivation had an impact on her physical appearance: "As a consequence her all-holy body appeared as mere skin clinging to the bones." Irene would also practice, to varying degrees, sleep restriction, particularly during the Dominical feasts, but also as part of her everyday asceticism.

=== Spiritual Gifts ===
Saint Irene was endowed with spiritual gifts because of her extraordinary level of virtue and asceticism; this includes the gift of sight, both her ability to know the feelings and behaviours of others and the ability to make predictions, as well as the performance of miracles. Not all of Irene's Divine acts, however, were included by her hagiographer, who claims: "In fact God performed many other wonderful deeds through her, and she wished them all to be veiled in silence for the time being."

==== Predictions ====
Irene is reported to have made several successful predications: the killings of Ceaser Bardas and Michael III; her own fame; the death of her good friend, Christopher; and the circumstances of her own death.

==== Miracles ====
- In an attack orchestrated by the devil, Irene was set on fire. One of the other nuns rushed to the aid of her abbess, to find: "Irene all in flames but standing immobile and unwavering and unconquered, paying no heed whatever to the fire." Irene was then removed from the fire by this same nun, as she was unable to extinguish the flames. While the saint's clothes and skin were scorched, she expressed concern only to scold the nun for interfering.
- A young nun who had only recently joined the convent after leaving behind a suitor and her noble life, was targeted by the evil one. The devil possessed the Cappadocian woman's former suitor, making him franctic with lust for her, so that he turned to erotic magic to force the nun to come back to him. The magic worked and the nun was stripped of her agency, leaving her with a coerced and violent desire for him; because of this, she threatened to take her own life should she be prevented from returning to him. With help from her nuns, the Abbess Irene cured the possessed nun, who was then returned to the convent.
- In another case of sexually violent possession, the devil incited desire in a certain Nicholas, a laymen who was employed to tend to the convent's vineyard. He was overtaken with coerced desire for one of the nuns and drempt that he had sexual intercourse with her. However, Nicholas incorrectly thought this had actually occurred, which then drove him insane: "Rolling on the earth and foaming at the mouth he suffered all the anguish of demoniacs." Irene sent him to be cured at the Church of the Great Martyr Anastasia, also in Constantinople, where he was locked up in chains. Nicholas remained possessed for several days, until Irene was finally able to cure him.
- In another miracle, one of Irene's nuns witnessed her:
  "hanging in the air about two cubits above the ground and praying with her hands extended towards heaven. Two lofty cypresses were standing on either side of the forecourt, reaching far up into the air. As Irene bent forward and prostrated herself before God, they trembled gently together and bowed their crowns to the ground along with her, waiting for her to rise. But even when the holy woman stood upright, the trees did not raise their crowns until approaching she made the sign of the cross on each of them; then, as if blessed, they returned to their erect position."
- The saint's relative was falsely accused of committing a conspiracy against the Emperor Basil I ( 867–886 CE) and was saved from execution due to Irene's interference.

==== The Apples ====
One morning, Irene heard a voice forewarning her that she will be gifted fruit from a sailor and instructed her to eat it. Later that day, a sailor from the Island of Patmos came to the convent bearing apples. He told Irene that he was out at sea on his boat, when a "beautiful and godlike old man" stopped their ship and came toward him "walking on the waves." This man handed him six apples, three for the Patriarch Ignatios and three for Irene. When Irene ate the first apple, it nourished and watered her for forty days; she did not have to consume anything else. The second apple she shared with her nuns. Irene kept the final apple "as an amulet, continuously smelling it and never lacking the joy it afforded."

== Legacy ==
In the Oxford Dictionary of Byzantium, Alexander Kazhdan describes Irene's notability as such: "Ideal ascetic, an efficient administrator of her convent, and as a preacher who attracted crowds, esp. women of the senatorial class." The saint is known for reaching sainthood in ways that were usually more common in male Lives, such as her ascetic practice and her youthful rise in the ecclesiastical ranks as abbess and deaconess. Furthermore, she was considered "impervious to temptation" and her Life includes miracles, which are notable for the theme of magic and demons.

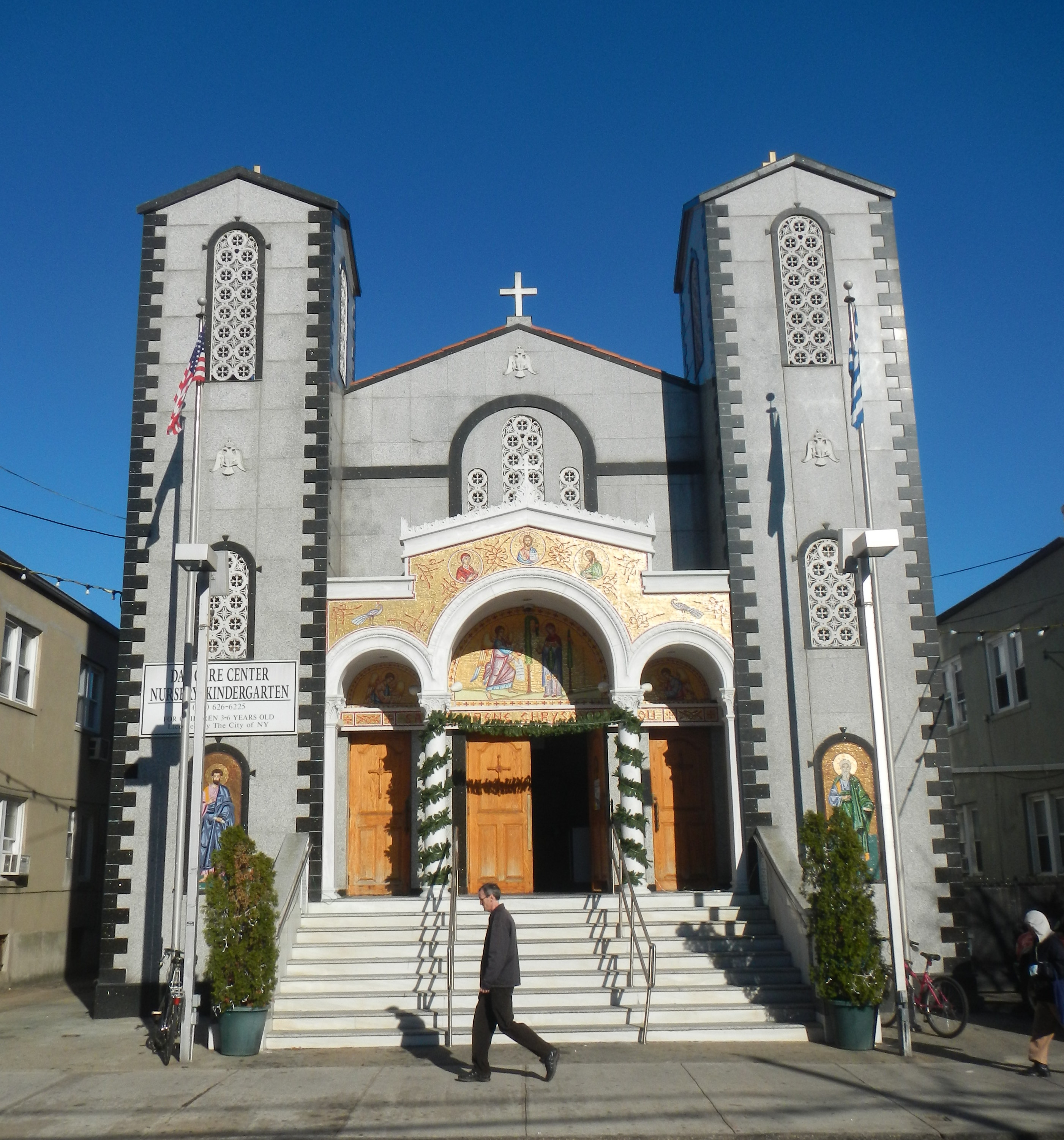
The Sacred Patriarchal and Stavropegial Orthodox Monastery of St. Irene Chrysovalantou, in Astoria in Queens, New York, United States.

=== Cult ===
It is said that after Irene's death, her coffin was visited by many for the purposes of healing. In particular, those who:

"are dragged into court by people who love evil more than good and lying rather than to speak righteousness. [...] Again the same applies to those upon whose wrath the sun goes down. For being named after the peace which passeth all understanding, she had received from her in full measure the gift of making peace."

Irene was included in the Synaxarian of Constantinople. Her feast day is celebrated on 28 July in the Eastern Orthodox liturgical calendar.

=== Modern Resurgence ===
In the 1920s there was a resurgence of Irene’s cult due to an icon of Irene, which was painted in 1919 by Nektarios, a monk on Mount Athos: "This icon represents the Saint flanked by two cypresses and holding three apples in her hand.". However, Nektarios and his fellow monk, Kyrillos Lemonias, “‘suffered martyrdom’” when they went to Smyrna, Nektarios’ birthplace, together. The Archimandrite Paisios Philiokaliotakis then transported Nektarios’ Icon of Irene from Mount Athos. Philiokaliotakis was the spiritual father of a woman named Lemonia, who was renamed Meletia when she was tonsured in 1926. This Meletia went on to find her own monastery, which she had originally planned to dedicate to the Taxiarchs, the archangels Michael and Gabrial. However, a workman from Piraeus, Greece, Michael Gerasimos, and another nun, both had visions of St. Irene, who informed them that the planned construction site was incorrect and should be moved; so the dedication was also changed to St. Irene under the guidance of Philiokaliotakis. This convent, the first to be devoted to Irene, was completed in 1930. It reached worldwide fame due to the supposed "miracle-working" of the Icon by Nektarios and visitors came from around the globe. One of the miracles attributed to the Icon of St. Irene by Nektarios: “tells the story of a certain Nikolaos Mavromatakis from Kifisia, whom St Irene on 14 July 1944 saved from being executed by German soldiers who unjustly suspected him of being a Communist partisan plotting against them.”. The miraculous Icon of St. Irene by Nektarios, "seems to have initiated the modern cult of Irene" and has since been copied multiple times.

The monk Gerasimos, from the monastery of Μικρὰ ῾Αγία Ἄννα (Mikragiannitis) of Mount Athos, wrote an Akolouthia of St. Irene which was composed between 1930–1950.

Greek Orthodox Church of St. Irene Chrisovalantou, in Toronto, Ontario, Canada

==== Churches & Monasteries ====
- Saint Irene of Chrysovalantou Greek Orthodox Church in Washington Township, Macomb County, Michigan, United States.
- Sacred Patriarchal and Stavropegial Orthodox Monastery of St. Irene Chrysovalantou, in Astoria, New York, United States.
- Greek Orthodox Church of St. Irene Chrisovalantou, in Toronto, Ontario, Canada.

== Hagiography ==
The Life of Irene, Abbess of Chrysobalanton is commonly understood as either a fictional account, or an account that has "ficticious elements" . This is because of the historical inaccuracies and narrative inconsistencies of the text, which also point to the text's composition occurring "generations" after Irene had lived, toward the end of the tenth century, during the reign of Basil II (976–1025 CE).

=== Authorship ===
The author of the Life of Irene remains unknown, however it has been suggested that a woman wrote the original text, either a nun of Chrysobalanton, a relative, or both. Female hagiographers are a rare occurrence in Byzantium, so the author of the Life of Irene, if she was indeed a woman, is one of few. Claudia Rapp explains "the convincing rendering of women's experience in the seclusion of the convent," is one of the arguments made in support of female authorship. Nathalie Delierneux suggests that the author may have also been an abbess, because of "the attribution to Irene of certain traits of holiness usually reserved exclusively for male saints might mark it as the work of a female author anxious to offer some relief to her subject’s asceticism.’’ It has been theorised that the author was an abbess of Chrysobalanton, with Rosenqvist suggesting that: "Irene was conceived as her ideal counterpart and model, distant enough to be used as a mouthpiece for her own veiled interests.". The idea that the author may have been related to Irene is supported by the themes of familial loyalty within the text, when the saint saves a relative from punishment when he is wrong accused of treachery. The theme of familial loyalty became more prominent in hagiography in the tenth century, which reflects the dating of the Life.

=== Audience ===
A manuscript from fourteenth century Florence, Italy, includes the Life of Irene of Chrysobalanton along with fourteen other Lives of female saints, which Alice-Mary Talbot suggests was compiled for a readership of nuns.

=== The Text ===
The Bibliotheca Hagiographica Graeca (BHG) attests to only one vita of Irene's life: BHG 952. The Life is preserved in eleven manuscripts, the earliest from the thirteenth century and the latest from the seventeenth century CE. There are three edited editions of the life, one of which is also translated into English.

==== List of Editions (BHG 952) ====
- "DE S. IRENE HEGUMENA VIRG. CONSTANTINOPOLI IN CHRYSOBALANTO." Joanne Pinio. (ed.). In Acta Sanctorum Julii. VI. Societe des Bollandistes. 1729: pp. 600-634.
- Mikragiannanites, Gerasimos , Ἀκολουθία… Εἰρήνης, ed. 5a (Athenis, 1959).
- Rosenqvist, Jan Olof (1986). The Life of St Irene Abbess of Chrysobalanton. A Critical Edition with Introduction, Translation, Notes and Indices. Acta Universitatis Upsaliensis.

==== Modern Language Translations ====
- Greek: Landos, Agapios (1656) “Βίος καὶ πολιτεία τῆς ὁσίας μητρὸς ἡμῶν Εἰρήνης ἡγουμένης τῆς μονῆς τοῦ Χρυσοβαλάντου”. In Καλοκαιρινή. Venice.
- English: Rosenqvist, Jan Olof (1986). The Life of St Irene Abbess of Chrysobalanton. A Critical Edition with Introduction, Translation, Notes and Indices. Acta Universitatis Upsaliensis.
- Greek: Τσάμης, Δημήτριος Γ. [Tsamis, Dimitrios G.] (1991), "Εἰρήνη Χρυσοβαλάντου". In Μητερικον. τόμος β. ΑΑΔΕΛΦΟΤΗΣ «ΑΓΙΑ ΜΑΚΡΙΝΑ». pp. 236-331.

== Bibliography ==
=== Primary Sources ===
- Rosenqvist, Jan Olof (1986). The Life of St Irene Abbess of Chrysobalanton. A Critical Edition with Introduction, Translation, Notes and Indices. Acta Universitatis Upsaliensis. Retrieved 2026-10-02.

=== Secondary Sources ===
- Cooper, Eric and Decker, Michael J. (2012). Life and Society in Byzantine Cappadocia. Pelgrave Macmillan. ISBN 978-1-137-02964-5.
- Delierneux, Nathalie (2014). "The Literary Portrait of Byzantine Female Saints". In Efthymiadis, Stephanos (ed.). Ashgate research companion to Byzantine hagiography. Volume II: Genres and Contexts. Ashgate. ISBN 978-0-7546-5033-1.
- Efthymiadis, Stephanos (2011). "Hagiography from the 'Dark Age' to the Age of Symeon Metaphrastes (Eighth–Tenth Centuries)". In Efthymiadis, Stephanos (ed.). The Ashgate Research Companion to Byzantine Hagiography. Volume I: Periods and Places. Ashgate. ISBN 978-0-7546-5033-1.
- Ellsberg, Robert (2025). Blessed Among Us: Day by Day with Saintly Witnesses; Volume 2. Liturgical Press. ISBN 979-8-4008-0171-6.
- "Feast of Saint Irene Chrysovalantou". Orthodox Times. https://orthodoxtimes.com/. Retrieved 2026-01-20.
- "Greek Community of Toronto | St. Irene Chrisovalantou". www.greekcommunity.org. Retrieved 2026-10-26.
- Hinterberger, Martin (2014). "The Byzantine Hagiographer and his Text". In Efthymiadis, Stephanos (ed.). Ashgate research companion to Byzantine hagiography. Volume 2: Genres and Contexts. Ashgate. ISBN 978-0-7546-5033-1.
- "Irene the Righteous of Chrysovalantou". Greek Orthodox Archdiocese of America. https://www.goarch.org/. Retrieved 2026-01-20.
- Kaplan, Michel; Kountoura-Galaki, Eleonora. "Economy and Society in Byzantine Hagiography: Realia and Methodological Questions". In Efthymiadis, Stephanos (ed.). Ashgate research companion to Byzantine hagiography. Volume II: Genres and Contexts. Ashgate. ISBN 978-0-7546-5033-1.
- Karras, Valerie A. (2004). "Female Deacons in the Byzantine Church". Church History. 73 (2): pp. 272–316. doi:10.1017/S000964070010928X. ISSN 1755-2613.
- Kazhdan, Alexander, ed. (1991). The Oxford Dictionary of Byzantium, 3 Volumes. Oxford University Press. ISBN 978-0-19-504652-6.
- Nikolaou, Katerina (2018). "The Depiction of Byzantine Woman in Hagiographical Texts (Eighth-Eleventh Centuries)". In Rigo, Antonio; Trizio, Michele; Despotakis, Eleftherios (eds.). Byzantine Hagiography: Texts, Themes & Projects. Brepols. ISBN 978-2-503-57771-5.
- "Our Patron Saint". St. Irene of Chrysovalantou Greek Orthodox Church. https://www.saint-irene.com/. Retrieved 2026-01-20.
- "Pinakes | Πίνακες - Notice: Irene hegumena in Chrysobalanto CP". pinakes.irht.cnrs.fr. Retrieved 2026-10-02.
- Rapp, Claudia (1996). "Figures of Female Sanctity: Byzantine Edifying Manuscripts and Their Audience". Dumbarton Oaks Papers. 50. doi:10.2307/1291749.
- "Sacred Patriarchal and Stavropegial Monastery of St. Irene Chrysovalantou". Sacred Patriarchal and Stavropegial Monastery of St. Irene Chrysovalantou. Retrieved 2026-10-26.
- "Saint Irene the Righteous of Chrysovalantou (28 July)". The Vema of the Church. https://vema.com.au/. Retrieved 2026-01-20.
- Talbot, Alice-Mary. "Translations of Byzantine Saints' Lives Listed Chronologically". Dumbarton Oaks. https://www.doaks.org/. Retrieved 2026-10-02.
- Talbot, Alice-Mary (2019). Varieties of monastic experience in Byzantium, 800-1453. University of Notre Dame Press. ISBN 978-0-268-10563-1.
- "Vita S. Irenae heg. in Chrysobalanto". Clavis Clavium. Brepols. https://clavis.brepols.net/ Retrieved 2026-10-02.
