= John Rinne =

His Eminence John
- Archbishop of Karelia and All Finland
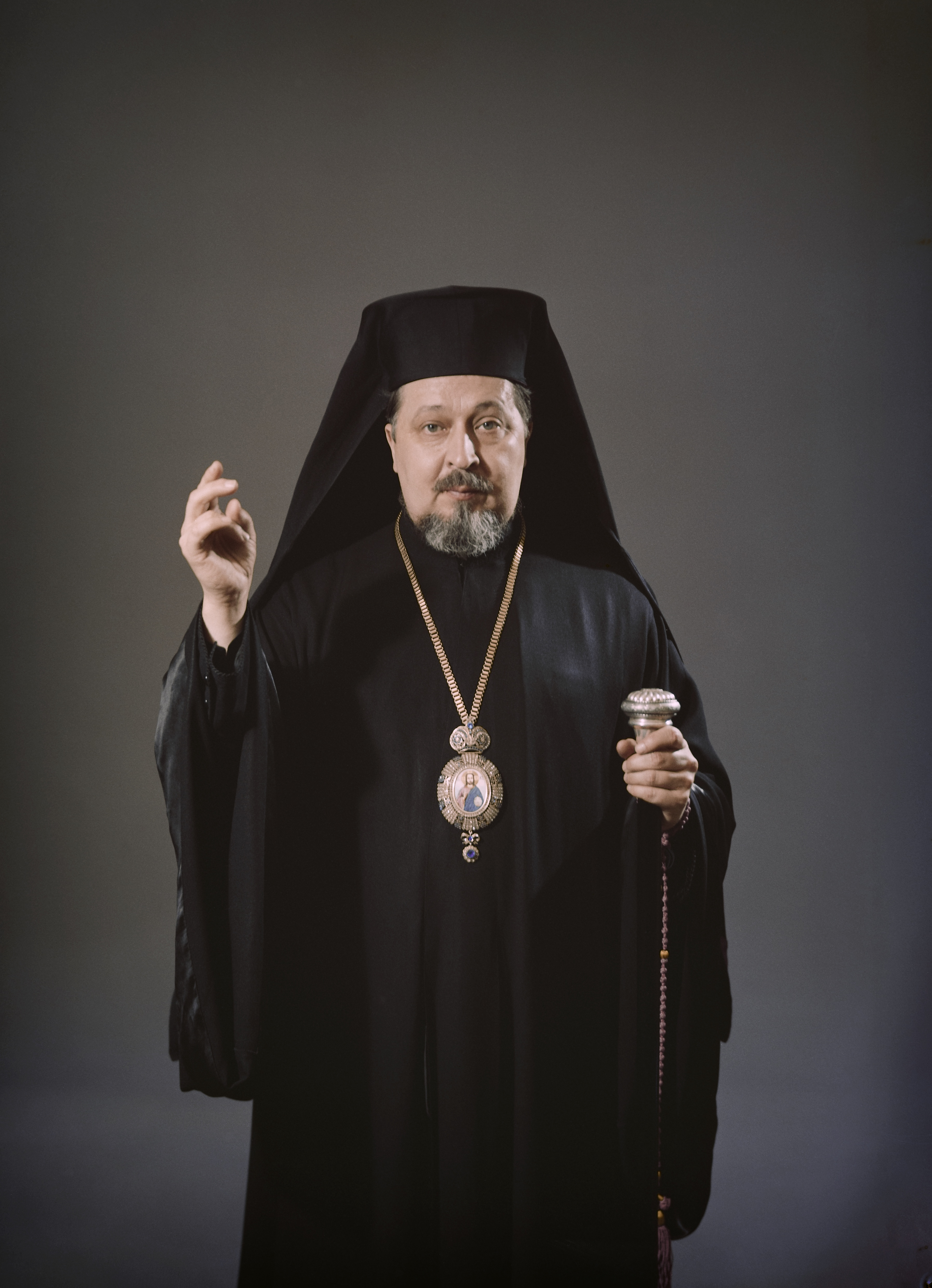
- Archbishop John in 1971
- Native name: Johannes Rinne
- Church: Orthodox Church of Finland
- Appointed: 1987
- Term ended: 2001
- Predecessor: Paul (Olmari)
- Successor: Leo (Makkonen)
- Other posts: Titular Metropolitan of Nicaea and Exarch of Bithynia (2001–2010)
- Previous posts: Bishop of Lapland (1969); Bishop (Later Metropolitan) of Helsinki (1970–1987)

Orders
- Ordination: 1967
- Consecration: 1969

Personal details
- Born: Johannes Wilho Rinne; 16 August 1923 Turku, Finland
- Died: 1 July 2010 (aged 86) Turku, Finland
- Denomination: Eastern Orthodox Christianity
- Education: Åbo Akademi; University of Thessaloniki

Metropolitan John (Secular name: Johannes Wilho Rinne) (16 August 1923 – 1 July 2010) was the Orthodox Archbishop of Karelia and All Finland from 1987 to 2001.

== Birth ==
Rinne was born in Turku, Finland, on 16 August 1923 to a family belonging to the Evangelical Lutheran Church of Finland.

== Priesthood and episcopacy ==
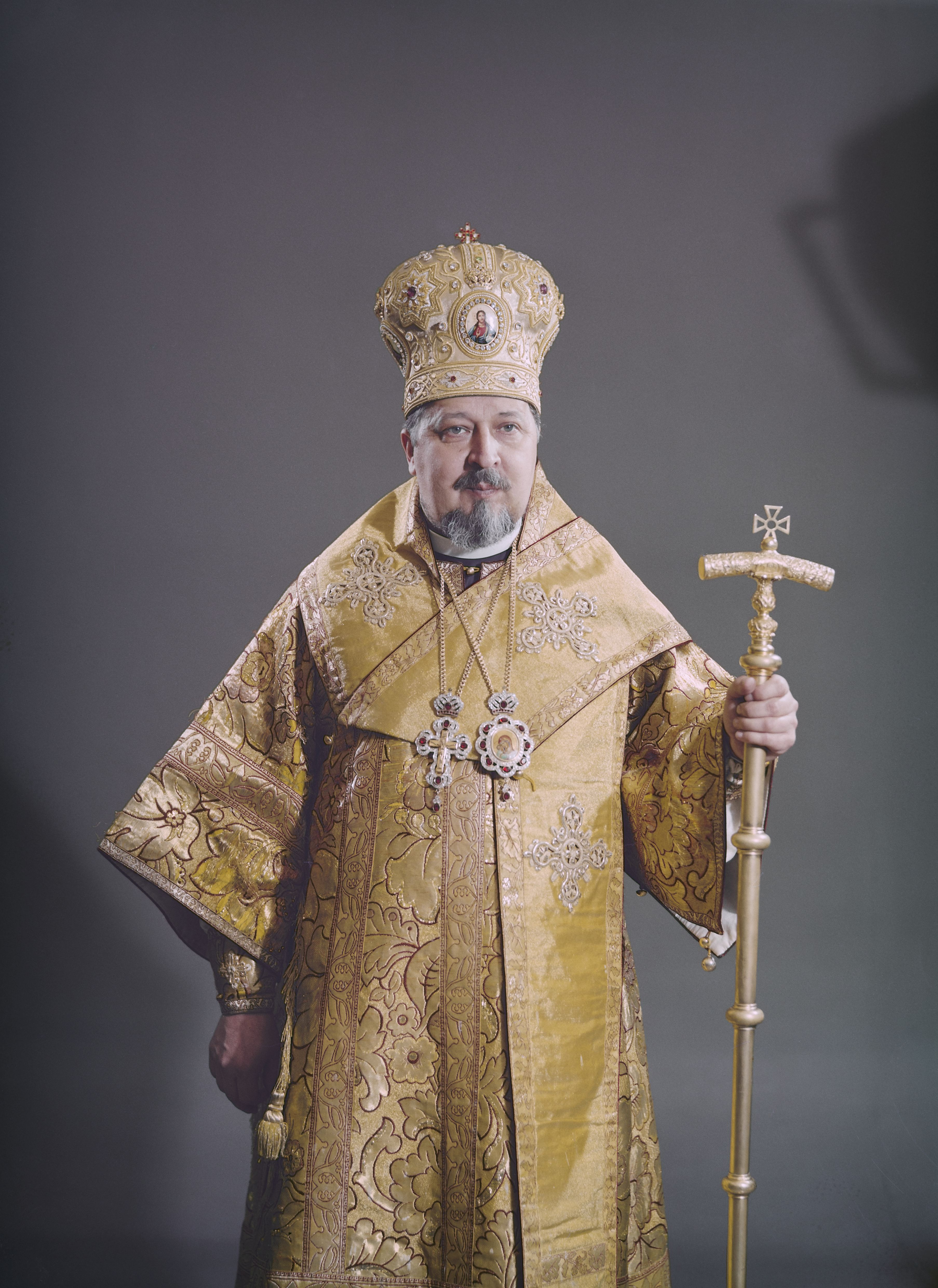
Archbishop John in liturgical vestments

Rinne joined the Eastern Orthodox Church in 1966, and he received a doctorate in theology from Finland's Åbo Akademi University in 1966. In 1967 he received monastic tonsure in the Monastery of Saint John the Theologian on the island of Patmos (Greece). Following his ordination to the diaconate and priesthood at the Ecumenical Patriarchate, in 1969 he was elected and consecrated Bishop of Lapland, Auxiliary to the Archbishop of Karelia and All Finland, of the autonomous Orthodox Church of Finland.

In 1971 Rinne received a doctorate in canon law from the University of Thessaloniki. He was appointed as the Metropolitan of Helsinki in 1972, a position he held until 1987. He was elected Archbishop of Karelia and All Finland and head of the autonomous Finnish Orthodox Church in 1987. He went into retirement in 2001, receiving from the Ecumenical Patriarchate the title of Metropolitan of Nicaea.

== Death ==
Rinne died on 1 July 2010 after a long illness. He is buried in Turku.

| Preceded by Paavali (Olmari) | Archbishop of Karelia and All Finland; 1987–2001 | Succeeded by Leo (Makkonen) |
