= Makarios of Pelekete =

Byzantine monk and abbot (c. 750 – 840)

Saint Makarios the Confessor
- An icon of St Makarios

Confessor Abbot of the Pelekete monastery
- Born: c. 750; Constantinople, Byzantine Empire (modern-day Istanbul, Turkey)
- Died: 18 August 840; Aphousia, Byzantine Empire (modern-day Avşa, Balıkesir, Turkey)
- Venerated in: Eastern Orthodox Church
- Feast: 1 April

Makarios the Confessor, Abbot of Pelekete (Greek: Μακάριος, born Christophoros, c. 750 – 18 August 840), was a Byzantine monk and iconodule who is venerated in the Eastern Orthodox Church. He is known for his time as the abbot of Monastery of St John the Theologian of Pelekete, and for his conflict with, and persecution by the iconoclast Emperors Leo V the Armenian, Michael II, and Theophilos.

== Background ==
Makarios was born in Constantinople around the middle of the eight century. Before he was tonsured, his name was Christophoros. He was orphaned as a young child, and was brought up by his uncle, who encouraged him to marry as early as he was able. Christophoros rejected this proposal, and retreated to an isolated church, whose priest gave him spiritual instruction, and eventually sent him to embrace monasticism at the Monastery of St John the Theologian of Pelekete. Here he was tonsured with the name Makarios, and he soon distinguished himself through obedience and humility. He was eventually made abbot of the monastery, and was confirmed in this office, and ordained, by Tarasius, Patriarch of Constantinople.

Makarios' biographer, who identifies himself as Sabas, claims that Emperor Leo IV promised to raise Makarios to a respectable position in the palace if he became an iconoclast, but Makarios refused. Makarios served as abbot in peace for around 15 years, before Emperor Leo V the Armenian began to enforce iconoclastic policy. The emperor is said to have promised him honours and riches in exchange for the support of his monastery. Makarios replied: "Honours and riches have no value for me. As for the sufferings endured for the true Faith, it is with pleasure that I will submit to all you find for me, and plenty more as well." In response, the emperor subjected him to various tortures, and sent him to prison. He remained imprisoned until the death of Leo V, when he was released by his successor, Michael II the Amorian. He lived for some time with the exiled Patriarch of Constantinople, Nikephoros.

He was eventually sent into exile on the island of Aphousia by Emperor Theophilos, who had renewed the assault on icons. He died there on 18 August 840.
