= Herman Aav =

Archbishop of the Orthodox Church of Finland (1878-1961)

His Eminence Herman
- Archbishop of Karelia and All Finland
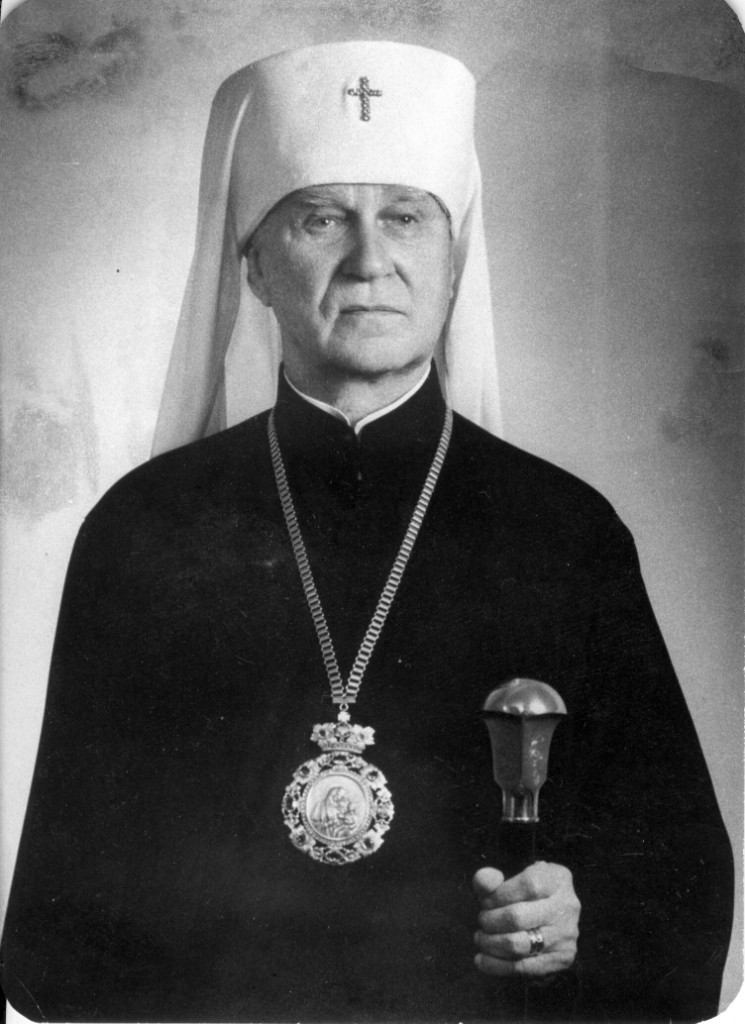
- Herman in 1930
- Native name: Herman Aav
- Church: Orthodox Church of Finland
- Appointed: 1925
- Term ended: 1960
- Predecessor: Seraphim (Lukjanov)
- Successor: Paul (Olmari)
- Previous post: Bishop of Sortavala (1923-1925)

Orders
- Ordination: 1904
- Consecration: 1923

Personal details
- Born: 2 September 1878 Hellanmaa, Muhu, Russian Empire
- Died: 14 January 1961 (aged 82) Kuopio, Finland
- Denomination: Eastern Orthodox Christianity
- Spouse: Ljubov Bobrovskaja (1904 - 1921)
- Children: 6

Archbishop Herman (Finnish: Arkkipiispa Herman, born Herman Aav or German Vasilyevich Aav, Russian: Герман Васильевич Аав) (b. 2 September 1878, Hellamaa, Russian Empire – d. 14 January 1961, Kuopio, Finland) was an Estonian-born Orthodox bishop who served from 1925 to 1960 as Archbishop of Karelia and All Finland of the Orthodox Church of Finland.

== Life ==
=== Childhood and education ===
Herman Aav was born in Muhu, Hellamaa, Russian Empire on 2 September 1878 to the family of cantor Vasili Aavi and Maria Ellik. Herman attended Hellamaa parish church school, Kuressaare city elementary school and studied at the spiritual school in Riga from 1889 and at the spiritual seminary from 1894 onwards.

=== Priesthood and marriage ===
In 1904, he married Ljubov Bobrovskaja. After that he was ordained a deacon and priest in the same year. She died during the birth of their sixth child in 1921 and the young priest suddenly became the sole parent of a large family.

=== Episcopacy ===
In 1922, the General Council of the Orthodox Church of Finland elected him as Vicar Bishop to the Archbishop of Vyborg and All Finland with the title Bishop of Sortavala.

The russian speaking Archbishop Serafim (Lukjanov) was transferred to termination pay from the beginning of 1924, and in 1925 the General Council elected Bishop Herman to this position. At the same time, the seat of the Archbishop moved from Vyborg to Sortavala, and the title became the Archbishop of Karelia and All Finland.

Archbishop Herman's life and work in Finland were active through the building of the spiritual and material life of the church. The Archbishop valued Finland and Karelia, patriotism and local traditions.

He was also a composer and author whose works have been published both in Estonia and Finland, some of them under pen name "H. Lumilill".

=== Retirement and death ===
Archbishop Herman retired in 1960 and moved to spend his retirement days in Kuopio. He died on 14 January 1961. He is buried in the Great Cemetery of Kuopio.

Preceded by Seraphim (Lukjanov)	Archbishop of Karelia and All Finland; 1925-1960	Succeeded by Paavali (Olmari)
