= Mikko Volotinen =

Finnish politician (1918–2002)

Member of the Parliament of Finland
- In office 1966–1970

Personal details
- Born: 4 September 1918
- Died: 23 November 2002 (aged 84)
- Political party: Centre Party

Mikko Volotinen (4 September 1918 – 23 November 2002) was a Finnish politician born in Kontiolahti. He served as a member of the Parliament of Finland from 1966 to 1970, representing the Centre Party. Volotinen also participated as a presidential elector in the 1962 and 1968 presidential elections.
