= Olli Bergman =

Finnish officer, diplomat and Orthodox church dean

Olli Oleg Bergman (5 November 1919 Helsinki – 2001) was a Finnish officer, a diplomat and an Orthodox church dean. By his education he was a master of political science.

Bergman's parents were Lieutenant-Colonel Konstantin Bergman and fashion designer Nina Machrakov.

Olli Bergman served as an officer in the Defense Forces in 1944–1953. After military war, he served as Assistant to the Ambassador in Moscow, Paris and Prague and as Finland's Consul General in Leningrad 1967–1970, Ambassador in Belgrade and Athens from 1970 to 1972 as Foreign Minister's Consultative Officer 1973-1980 and Ambassador in Bucharest and Tirana 1980-1983

Between 1973 and 1978 Bergman served as Secretary General of the Nordic Council of Ministers.
