= Claudia Rapp =

German scholar

Claudia Rapp FBA
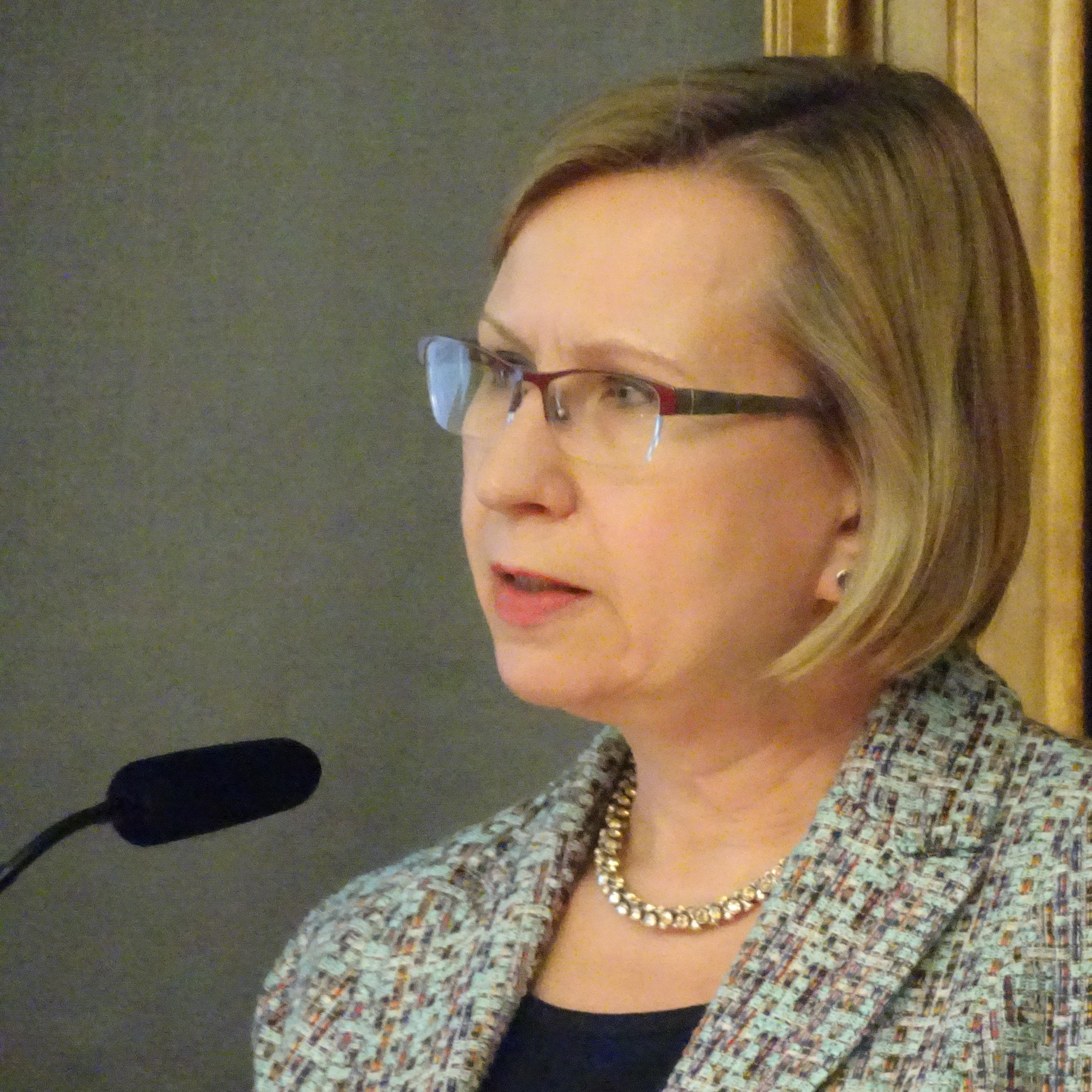
- Portrait of Claudia Rapp

Academic background
- Education: University of Oxford
- Thesis: The Vita of Epiphanius of Salamis : an historical and literary study (1991)

Academic work
- Notable works: Brother-Making in Late Antiquity and Byzantium: Monks, Laymen, and Christian Ritual

Claudia Rapp FBA is a German scholar of the Byzantine Empire. She is currently Professor of Byzantine Studies at the University of Vienna, a position she has held since 2011.

Having studied at the Free University of Berlin, she then obtained her D.Phil. in Modern History at the University of Oxford in 1992. She was a Professor in the History Department of the University of California, Los Angeles between 1994 and 2011, before taking up her current post in Vienna. In 2012 she became the Director of the Division of Byzantine Research at the Austrian Academy of Sciences and became a Full Member of the Academy two years later. In 2015 she was awarded the prestigious Wittgenstein Prize. In July 2017, she was elected a Corresponding Fellow of the British Academy (FBA), the national academy for the humanities and social sciences in the UK.

== Career and research ==
Rapp is a member of the editorial board of the online open-access journal Medieval worlds.

She is the author of two major monographs, and has published over fifty research articles in English and German.

On 4 November 2019 Rapp gave the twenty-eighth annual W. Kendrick Pritchett Lecture at University of California, Berkeley, with 'The Monastery of Saint Catherine in the Sinai and its Manuscripts: A Crossroads of Christendom in the Late Antique Mediterranean'.

== Selected bibliography ==
=== Monographs ===
- Holy Bishops in Late Antiquity: The Nature of Christian Leadership in a Time of Transition (Berkeley, California University Press, 2005, paperback 2013).
- Brother-Making in Late Antiquity and Byzantium: Monks, Laymen, and Christian Ritual (Oxford University Press, 2016).

=== Edited volumes ===
- Bosphorus. Essays in Honour of Cyril Mango (with S. Efthymiadis, D. Tsougarakis), (Amsterdam, Byzantinische Forschungen, 21, 1995)
- Elites in Late Antiquity (with Michele Salzman), special issue of the journal Arethusa 33 (2000)
- The City in the Classical and Post-Classical World. Changing Contexts of Power and Identity (with H. Drake), (New York, Cambridge University Press, 2014)
- T he Bible in Byzantium: Appropriation, Adaptation, Interpretation (with A. Külzer), Journal of Ancient Judaism. Supplements 25 (Göttingen, Vandenhoeck & Ruprecht, 2018)
- Pilgrimage to Jerusalem. Journeys, Destinations, Experiences across Times and Cultures: Proceedings of the Conference held in Jerusalem, 5th to 7th December 2017, Heidelberg: Propylaeum, 2020 (with F. Daim, J. Pahlitzsch, J. Patrich, J. Seligman), (Mainz, Byzanz zwischen Orient und Okzident, Vol. 19, 2020)
