= Saastamoinen =

Saastamoinen is a Finnish surname. Notable people with the surname include:

- Armas Saastamoinen (1886–1946), Finnish businessman
- Eino Saastamoinen (1887–1946), Finnish gymnast
- Yrjö Saastamoinen (1888–1966), Finnish diplomat and CEO
- Jarmo Saastamoinen (born 1967), Finnish football player
