= Karelian Brotherhood =

Karelian Brotherhood (Finnish: Karjalan veljeskunta, Russian: Карельское братство) was an organization founded in 1907 as a Russian Orthodox society. The goal of the organisation was to russify Karelias orthodox population. It had close ties to Russian nationalists in the State Duma.

The chief of the organization was Bishop Cyprian (Shnitnikov) of Serdobol Karjalan veljeskunta was dissolved when Finland obtained its independence in 1917.
