= Hellamaa, Saare County =

Village in Estonia

Coordinates: 58°36′43″N 23°17′52″E

Hellamaa
- Village
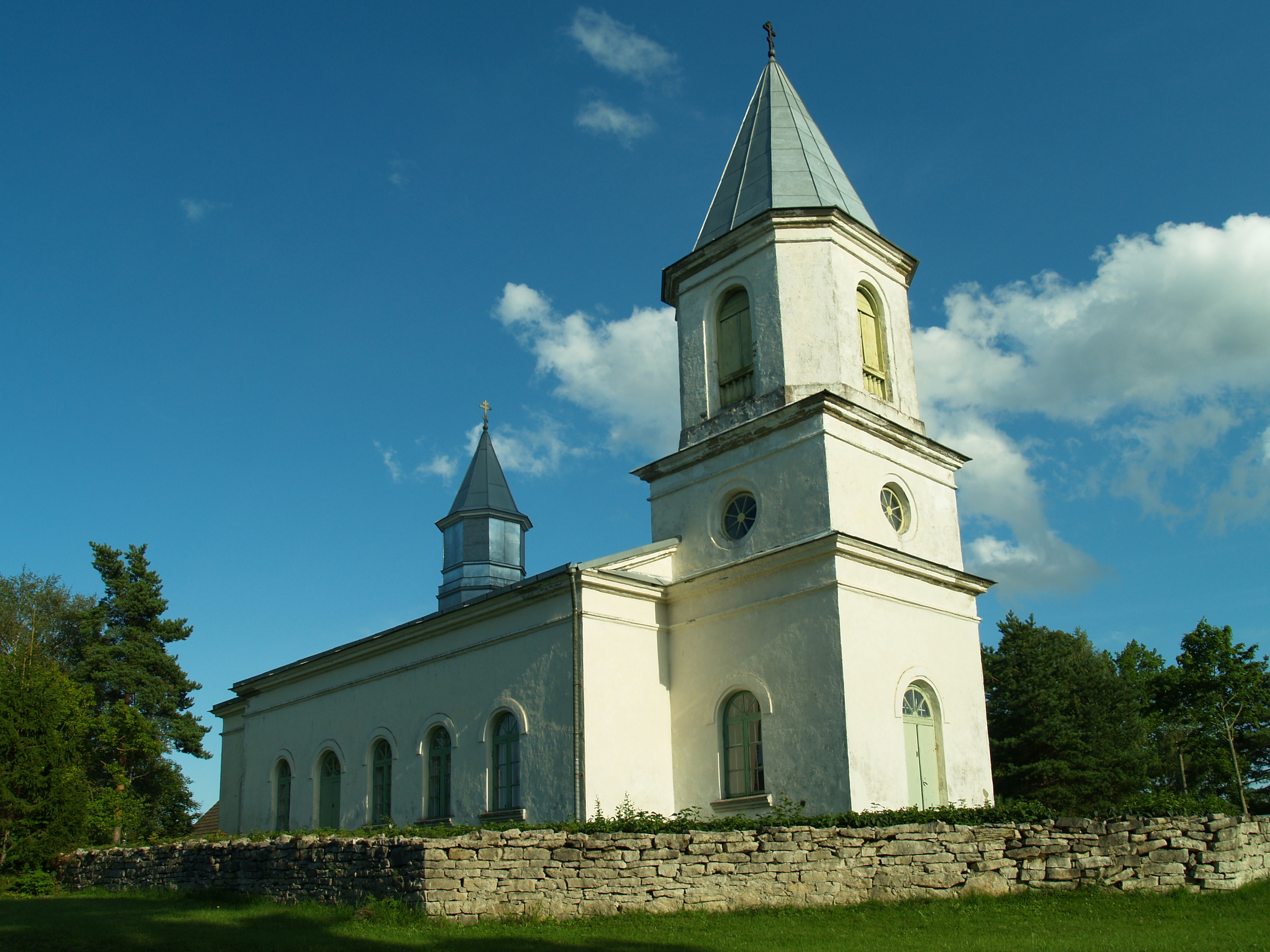
- Hellamaa church
- Interactive map of Hellamaa
- Country: Estonia
- County: Saare County
- Parish: Muhu Parish
- Time zone: UTC+2 (EET)
  - Summer (DST): UTC+3 (EEST)

Pupils of the Hellamaa village school, 1927

Hellamaa is a village in Muhu Parish, Saare County in western Estonia. The town has a library, Hellamaa raamatukogu.
