= John of Pskov =

Russian Orthodox Saint

Saint John of Pskov
- Died: 24 October 1616
- Venerated in: Eastern Orthodox Church
- Feast: 24 October

John, Hermit of Pskov (died 1616) was an Eastern Orthodox saint.

He lived in a period of terrible suffering and war between the Russian, Polish, and Swedish governments at the turn of the 16th to 17th centuries. He is credited with the gift of powerful intercession with God under the care of the saints and Mother of God of the Pskov Caves.

St John... "lived within the city walls for 23 years; his fish was rancid and he did not eat bread. He lived within the city as though in a wilderness, in great silence," and he died on October 24, 1616.

He is commemorated on 24 October in the Eastern Orthodox Church.

== See also ==
- Christian monasticism
- Poustinia
- Jan Tyranowski, lay hermit of Poland
