= Paul Olmari =

His Eminence Paul
- Archbishop of Karelia and All Finland
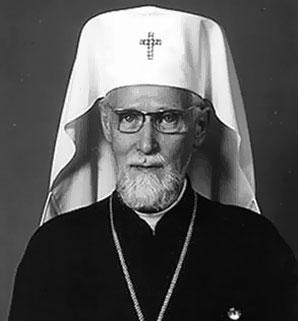
- Archbishop Paul in 1961
- Native name: Paavali Olmari
- Church: Orthodox Church of Finland
- Appointed: 1960
- Term ended: 1987
- Predecessor: Herman (Aav)
- Successor: John (Rinne)
- Previous post: Bishop of Joensuu (1955-1960)

Orders
- Ordination: 1938
- Consecration: 1955

Personal details
- Born: Georgij Aleksandrovitš Gusev; 28 August 1914 St. Petersburg, Russian Empire
- Died: 2 December 1988 (aged 74) Kuopio, Finland
- Denomination: Eastern Orthodox Christianity

Archbishop Paul (Finnish: Arkkipiispa Paavali, secular name Yrjö Olmari, born Georgi Alvovich Gusev, Russian: Георгий Алвович Гусев; August 28, 1914 – December 2, 1988) was the primate of the Orthodox Church of Finland and Archbishop of Karelia and All Finland from 1960 to 1987.

== Youth ==
Georgi Gusev was born in St. Petersburg, Russia on August 28, 1914 to Alexander Gusev, a railway clerk, and his wife Anna (née Vodomensky) of St. Petersburg. When the Russian Revolution broke out the family moved to Viipuri/Vyborg in Finland on the Gulf of Finland and changed their family name to Olmari. Georgi changed his given name to the Finnish Yrjö, and his father to Alvi.

== Education ==
In 1926, Yrjö attended the classic grammar school in Viipuri, but his attendance was cut short by the death of his father in 1932. In 1932 he entered the seminary in Sortavala and graduated in 1936. After graduating he carried out his obligatory military service.

At the seminary, Yrjö worked with the student choir and as deputy director of the Sortavala Cathedral choir. He also began adapting the Slavic language vocal music of the church for use with Finnish.

== Monastic life ==
In late 1937, Yrjö joined the Valaam Monastery on Lake Lodoga, which at the time was within the borders of Finland. In 1938 at the age of twenty three, Yrjö was tonsured a monk with the name Paavali (Finnish form of Paul) and entered Holy Orders. Paavali taught at the monastery school and directed a choir of Finnish speaking novices.

During the period of hostilities between Finland and the Soviet Union, lasting from the Winter War of 1939/1940 and its continuation through World War II, Fr. Paavali was initially called to service as a military chaplain and took part in the evacuation of Valaam monastery.

== Priestly ministry ==
As the war continued he served as a priest to evacuees in Joensuu and Kauhava. During the Continuation War he served in the Aunus (Onega) district in eastern Karelia and after transfer to Jamsa in 1942, he taught religion at a camp for students from eastern Karelia.

After the war Paavali served the Joensuu community as a priest, and was appointed editor at the Council of the Publication of Orthodox Literature. He also was named editor-in-chief of the magazine Dawn. In 1948 he was assigned as priest to a congregation in Kuopio where he also began editing liturgical service books and scores for church vocal music. In his editorial work he placed emphasis of the importance of divine worship and Holy Communion, pruning cultural features from the texts to produce a collection of texts and music designed for worship in Finnish. This collection came to be known as "Paavali's liturgy." After his death, many of his alterations to the divine liturgy has been abolished.

== Episcopacy ==
In 1955 Paavali was elected Bishop of Joensuu (the assistant bishop to the Archbishop of Karelia), a position that had been vacant since 1925. On August 29, 1960, he was elected Archbishop of Karelia and All Finland. Under his leadership the Orthodox Church was recognised as the Second Finnish State Church in 1978.

Paavali worked in the development of the liturgical life of the Finnish Church, encouraging frequent communion of the faithful; Church membership grew. He also worked on the development of New Valaam Monastery as a functioning monastery as well as the site of an Orthodox Culture and Research Institute.

Paavali wrote a number of books on Eastern Orthodoxy and Orthodox life. The most notable in English was The Faith We Hold. In 1967 he was awarded an honorary doctorate by the Theological Faculty of the University of Helsinki. Also, he was named a member of the Leningrad Theological Academy.

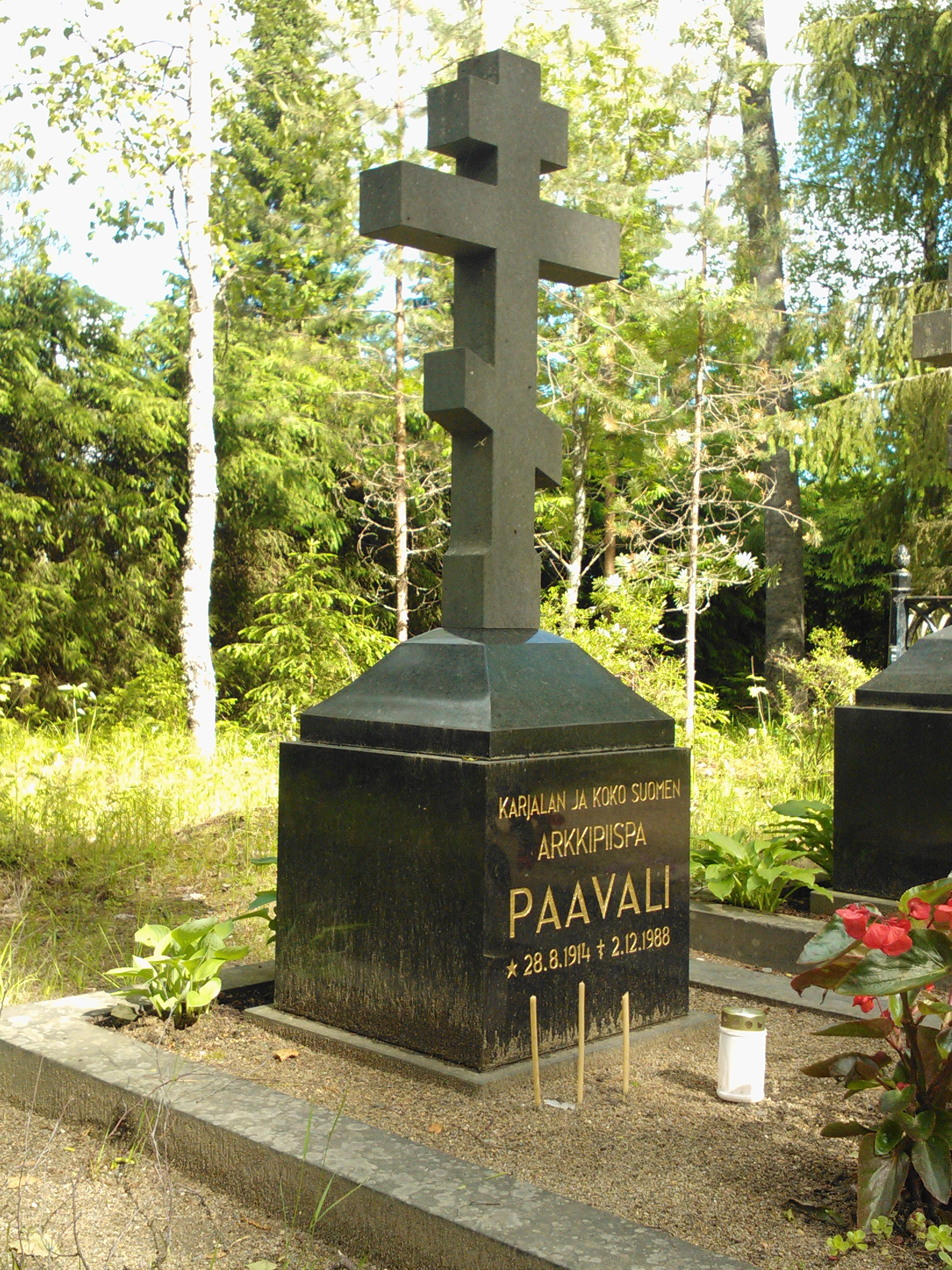
Tombstone of archbishop Paul in graveyard of New Valaam monastery.

== Retirement and death ==
Paavali retired as Archbishop of Karelia in 1987 and was succeeded by Johannes (Rinne). On 2 December 1988 he died after suffering a serious head injury after he fell on a icy street in Kuopio on the day before. He was afterwards buried in the cemetery of New Valaam Monastery.

== Bibliography ==
- The Faith We Hold. transl. by Marita Nykänen and Esther Williams; with a foreword by Alexander Schmemann. Crestwood, New York : St. Vladimir's Seminary Press 1980, ISBN 978-0-91383-663-7.
- The Feast of Faith: An Invitation to the Love Feast of the Kingdom of God. transl. Esther Williams. Crestwood, New York : St Vladimir's Seminary Press, 1988, ISBN 978-0-881-41072-3.

Preceded by Herman (Aav)	Archbishop of Karelia and All Finland; 1960–1987	Succeeded by Johannes (Rinne)
