= Petros Sasaki =

Finnish iconographer (1939–1999)

- 佐々木巌
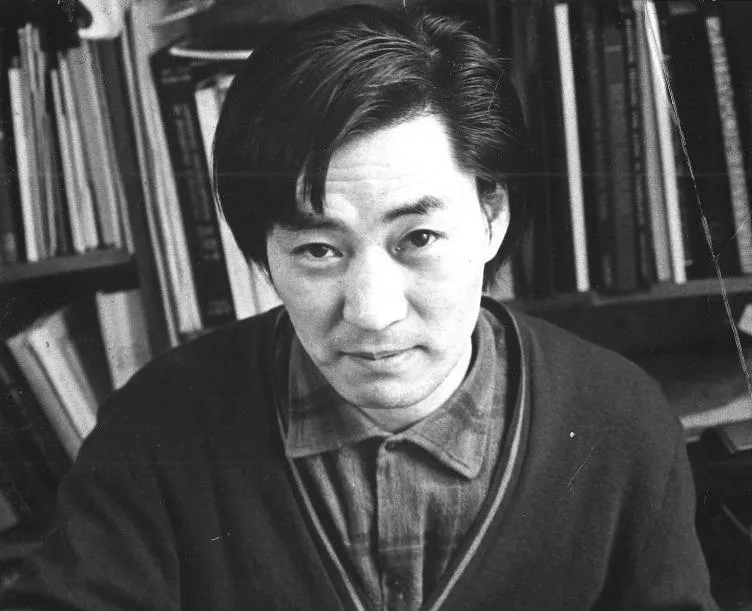
- Born: Petros Iwao Sasaki; August 23, 1939; Ōdate, Akita Prefecture, Japan
- Died: March 30, 1999 (aged 59); Kuopio, Finland
- Resting place: Lintula Holy Trinity Convent, Heinävesi, Finland
- Education: National and Kapodistrian University of Athens
- Occupations: iconographer, painter

Petros Iwao Sasaki (Japanese: 佐々木 巌; August 23, 1939 – March 30, 1999) was a Finnish iconographer from Japan.

== Biography ==
Born on August 23, 1939, in Ōdate, Japan, into an Orthodox family, he was already the third generation in his family to be Orthodox.

From 1964, he studied Orthodox theology and icon painting at the University of Athens (Greece), combining his studies with practical work in the field of church art. In April 1967, after the military coup in Greece, he was ordered to leave the country.

In January 1968, he came to Finland, where, with the support of Archbishop Paul of Karelia (Gusev-Olmari), he obtained work painting the newly built Orthodox churches and settled in the city of Kuopio. Sasaki spent his first summer at the New Valaam Monastery among Russian monks and later opened an icon painting circle in Kuopio, fulfilling both church and private orders for icon painting. His first major commission was to paint the iconostasis and a series of icons for the Trinity Cathedral of the Lintula Monastery built in 1973.

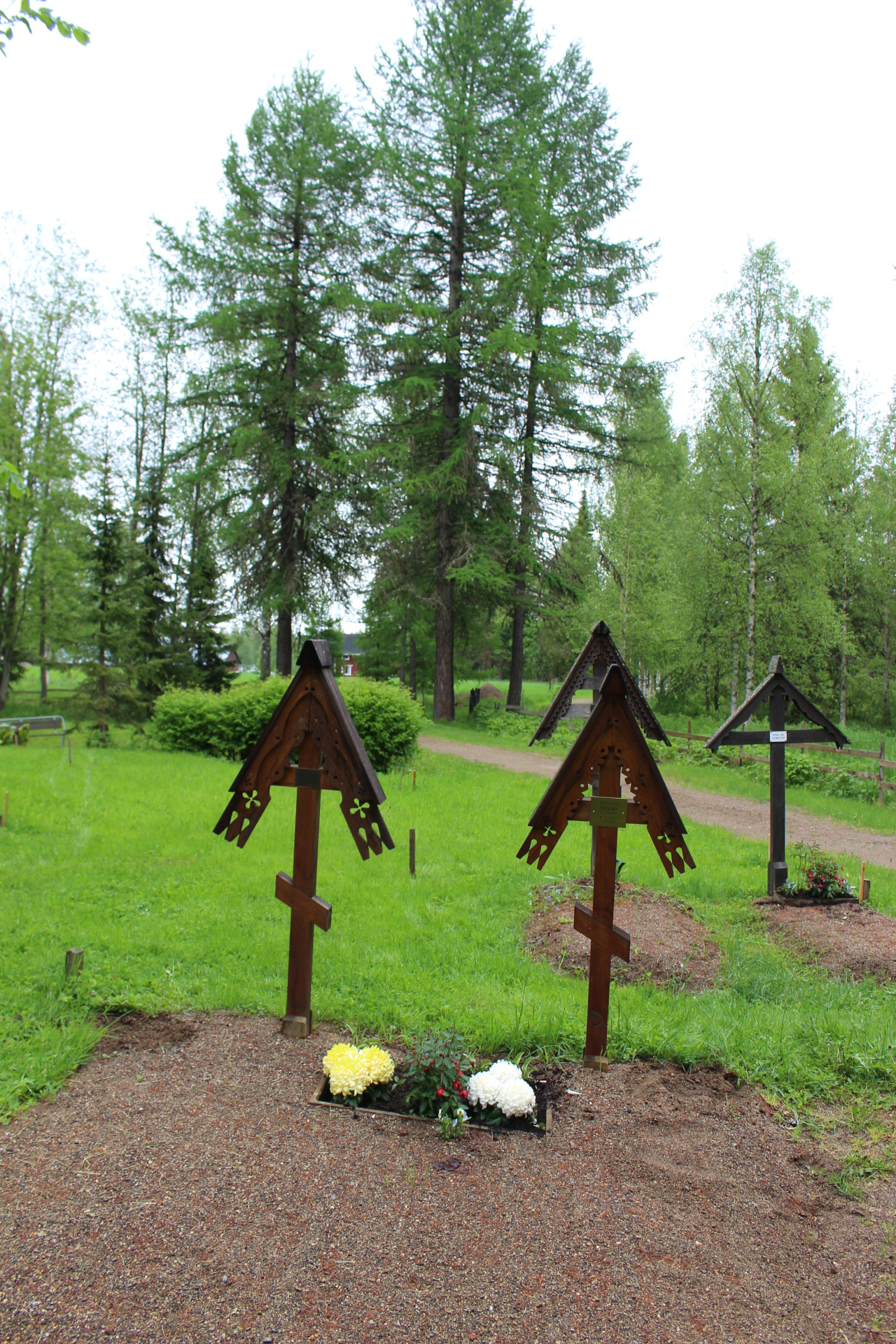
Petros Sasaki's grave at the Lintula Monastery cemetery

In 1972 and 1973, the Finnish newspaper Savon Sanomat published two articles about Sasaki. In an interview, the icon painter stated that he spoke Finnish poorly and was studying the language by comparing Bible texts in Japanese and Finnish. He preferred to paint icons at night and rested until noon during the day.

In 1975, Sasaki received Finnish citizenship.

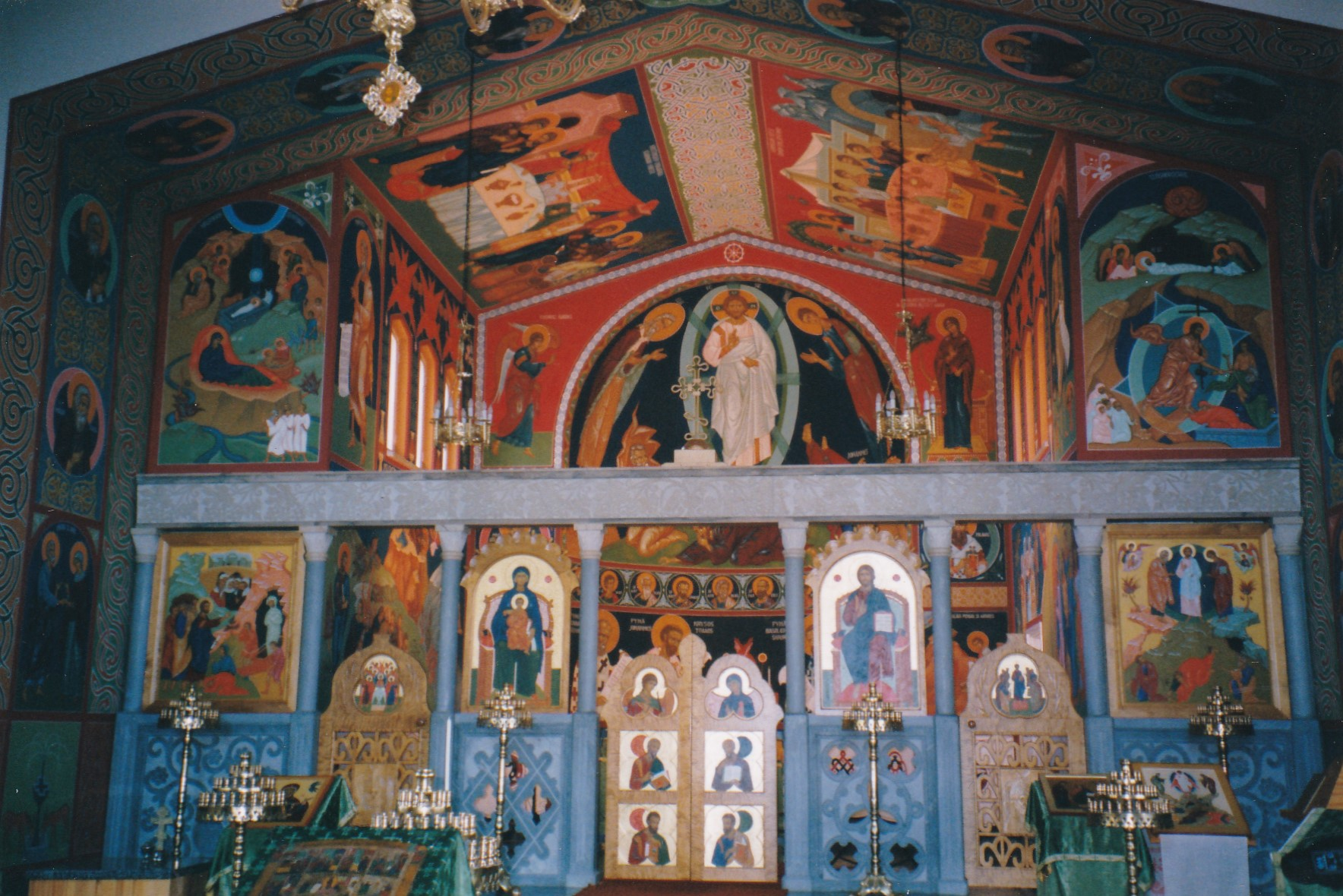
Kajaani's Cathedral of the Transfiguration

The icon painter painted several newly built Finnish churches. One of his most famous paintings is the iconostasis of the Transfiguration Church in Kajaani, built in 1959 according to the design of architect Ilmari Ahonen, executed in the style of Byzantine church tradition. Sasaki worked on painting this church until the end of his life, with his last work being an image of John the Baptist to the right of the altar.

Sasaki is sometimes referred to as the father of Finnish iconography as he trained a whole generation of icon painters, particularly in Kuopio and Oulu.

He died from cancer on March 30, 1999, and was buried in the cemetery of the Lintula Monastery.

== Art style ==
A characteristic feature of Sasaki's creative style was his attention to the smallest details. It has been said of Sasaki that he combined Japanese and Finnish aesthetics in his work, "revolutionized the Finnish icon painting tradition," and that thanks to him, "icon painting gained a new life in Finland."
