= Ivan Kudrjavzev =

Ivan Nikolayevich Kudryavtsev
- Иван Николаевич Кудрявцев
- Born: 13 April 1904; Saint Petersburg, Russian Empire
- Died: 13 August 1995 (aged 91); Helsinki, Finland
- Occupation: Architect

Ivan Nikolayevich Kudryavtsev (Russian: Иван Николаевич Кудрявцев; 13 April 1904 — 13 August 1995) was a Soviet and Finnish architect, architectural historian, and teacher. He was a representative of the Kudryavtsev dynasty of architects.

== Life and career ==
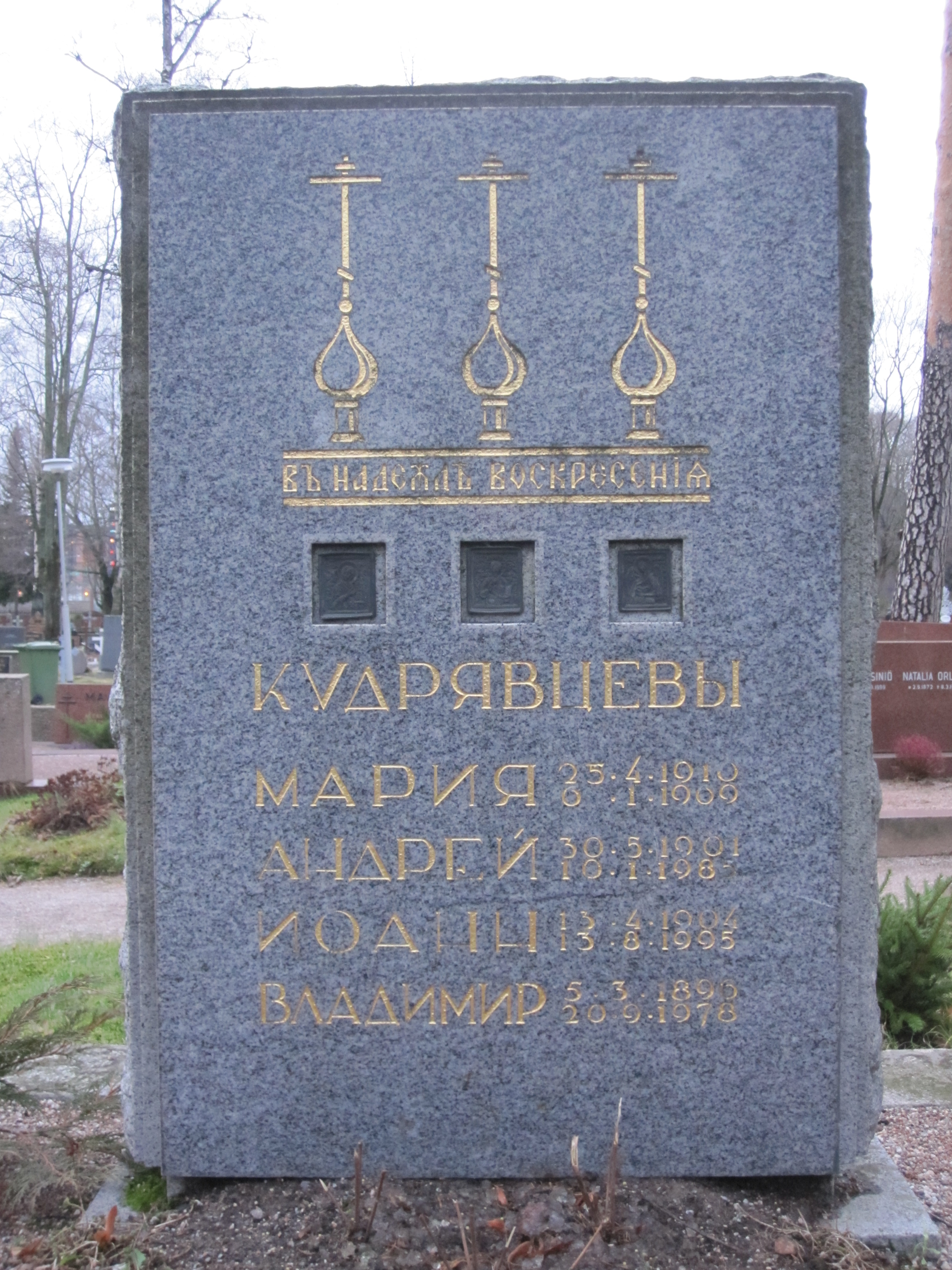
Family burial of the Kudryavtsevs at the Orthodox cemetery in Helsinki

Kudrjavzev was born in St. Petersburg into the family of the hereditary architect Nikolai Galaktionovich Kudryavtsev, builder of the Kazan Cathedral in the city of Luga. The family retained Finnish citizenship.

In 1923, Kudrjavzev graduated from school in Petrograd and entered the Architectural Institute (later included in the Academy of Arts).

In February 1928, Kudrjavzev was awarded the title of architect for his graduation project for the building of the Academy of Arts and the Art and Industrial College.

In 1930, Kudrjavzev began working at the newly created Architectural College in Leningrad, where for five years he taught a course in the history of architecture and taught architectural design.

In 1931 Kudrjavzev was arrested without charges, and after his release six months later he returned to the design workshop of the People's Commissariat for Posts and Telegraphs of the USSR, which was designing buildings for telephone exchanges, post offices and houses of culture for communication workers. Kudrjavzev was the author of the projects for the buildings of the Krasnoarmeyskaya and Vasileostrovskaya ATS, residential buildings at the Vyborg ATS in Leningrad, the Communications House in Petrozavodsk, the telephone directorate house, and the competition project for the air terminal. The architecture of Kudrjavzev's buildings was characteristic of the 1930s as an example of Art Deco - a kind of symbiosis of constructivist methods and shaping techniques, definitely associated with the classical tradition.

In 1938, Kudrjavzev was expelled from Leningrad to Finland as a citizen of that country, where he settled in Helsinki. Having mastered Swedish, he entered the service of the Paul Buman company as a draftsman, which was engaged in engineering equipment, interior design, and furnishing.

During the Continuation War, Kudrjavzev was at the front in the Finnish troops, and after the end of hostilities he continued to work at the Paul Buman company. In 1961 he was appointed its director and worked in this position until 1979. He went on several business trips abroad, including to the Soviet Union.

Kudrjavzev devoted a lot of time to the maintenance of a Russian nursing home, and from 1967, he headed the Russian Charitable Society in Finland.

Kudrjavzev donated his archive to the Slavic collection “Slavica” of the University of Helsinki library.

Kudrjavzev died on 13 August 1995 in Helsinki and was buried in the Orthodox section of the cemetery in the Lapinlahti area.

== Work ==
One of the main components of Kudrjavzev's creative activity in Finland was the design (on a voluntary basis) and construction of Orthodox churches. He designed the Elias Church at the Orthodox cemetery in Helsinki (1951–1953), the Transfiguration Cathedral of the New Valamo Monastery in Heinävesi (1975–1977), and the temple in the city of Järvenpää (1979–1980).

In 1965, Kudrjavzev developed a sketch of an Orthodox church in Stockholm, but the project was not implemented. The architecture of his temples is characterized by a neo-Russian style, based on the images of the ancient architecture of Novgorod and Pskov. The Cathedral of the New Valamo Monastery became the prototype of the Orthodox Church in Brick Township (1998, New Jersey, United States, architect B. Bennett).

Kudrjavzev supervised the reconstruction and repairs of the St. Nicholas Church of the St. Nicholas Orthodox community and the house of the Russian Charitable Society in Helsinki. He designed iconostases and church utensils. He collaborated with Russian artists: images for the Ilyinskaya Church were created by artists of the Icon society. The interior of the temple in Järvenpää was painted by Yuri Mitroshin. The sculptor-ceramist Michael Schilkin participated in the decoration of the facades of the Elias Church.

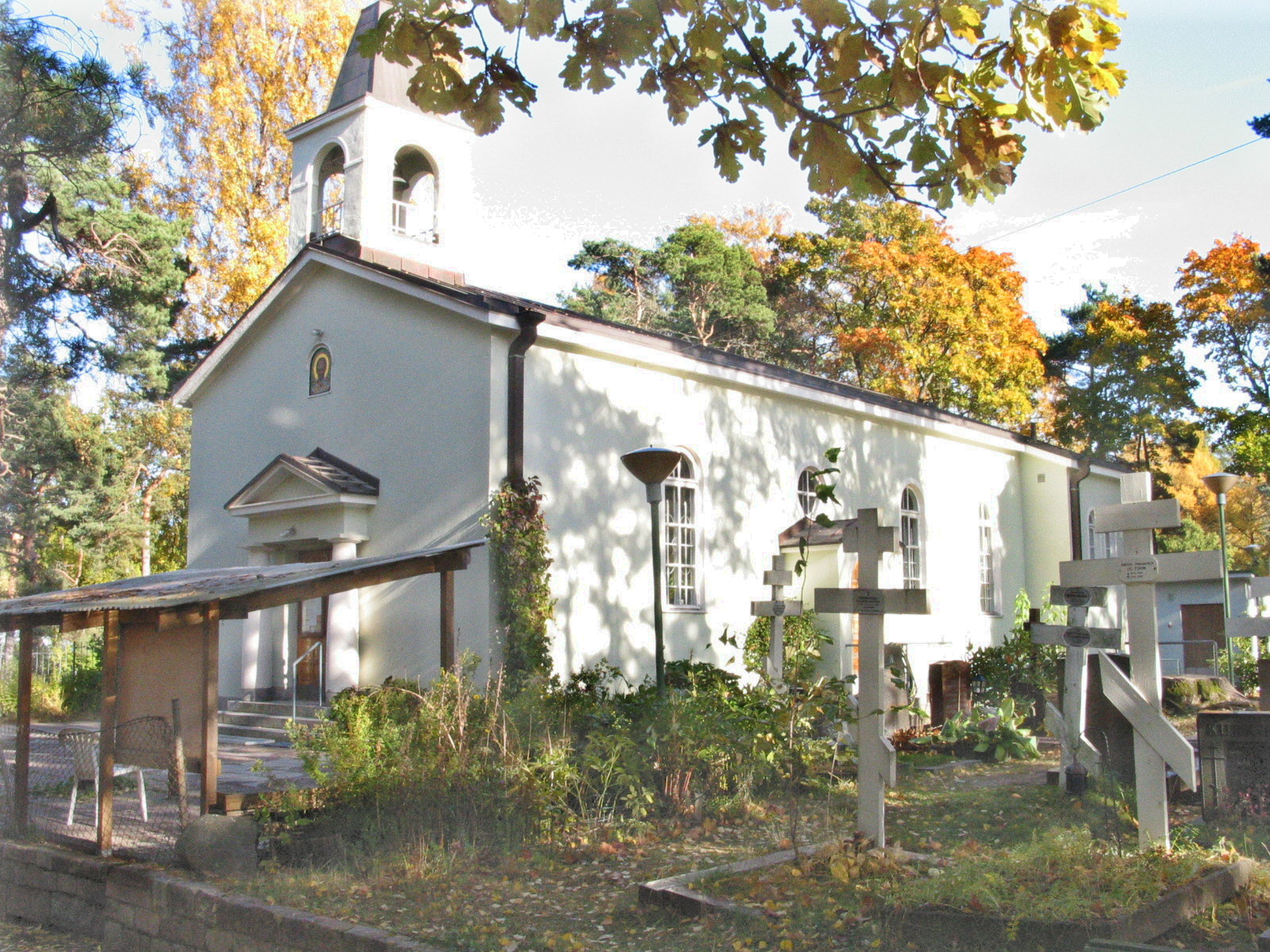
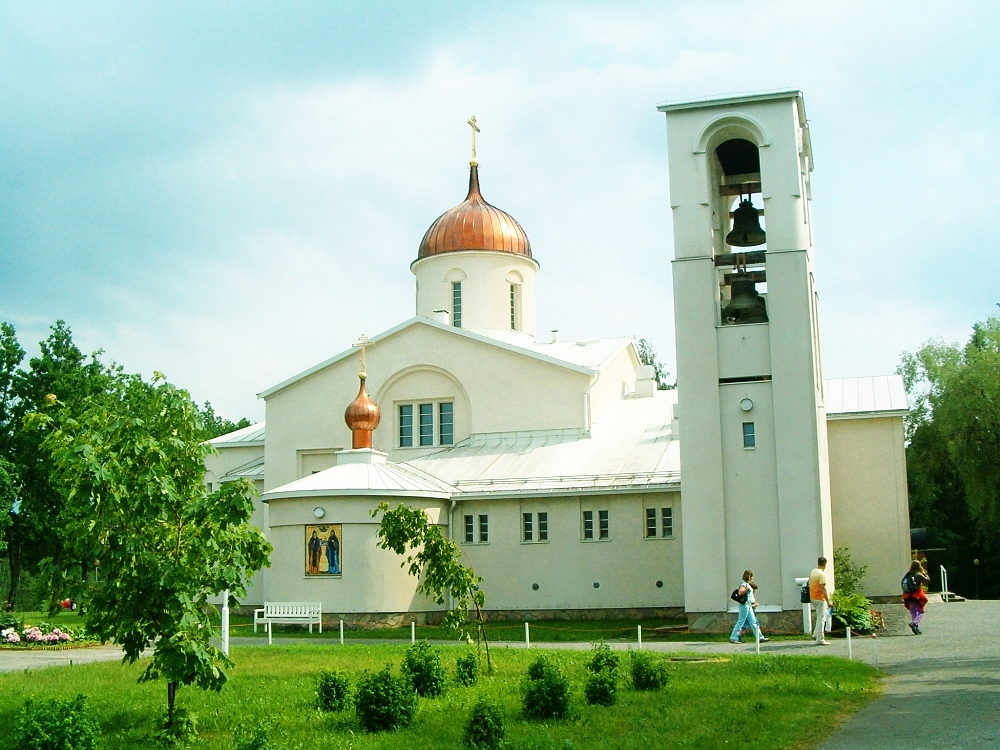
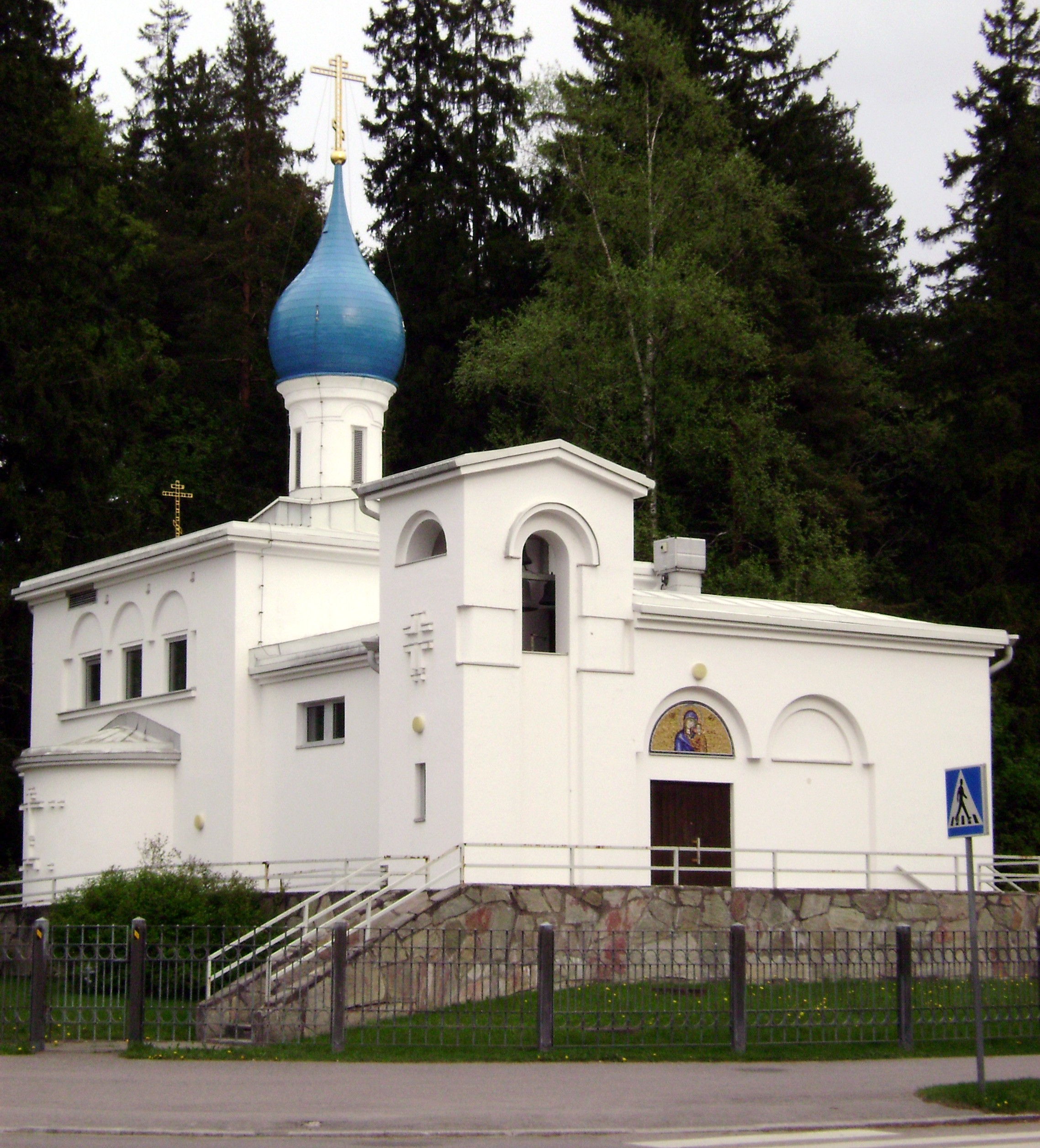
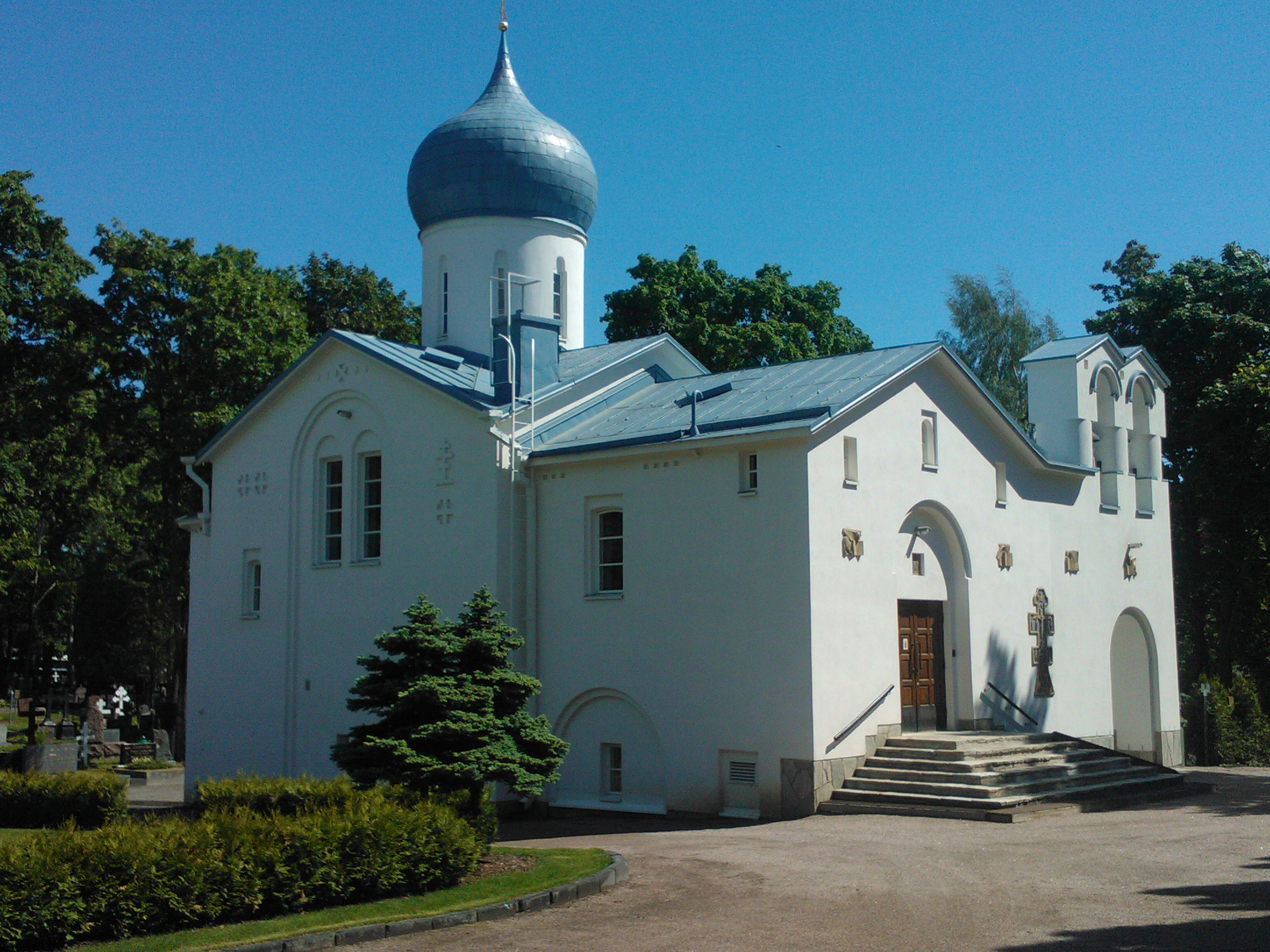
City	Building	Year	Photo	Address	Comments
Helsinki	St. Nicholas Church	1938		Tuonelankuja 3, Helsinki	Reconstruction, 1949-1950
Heinävesi	Transfiguration Cathedral; New Valamo Monastery	1977		Valamontie 42, Uusi-Valamo
Järvenpää	Kazan Church	1979		Kartanontie 45, Järvenpää
Helsinki	Elias Church	1953

== Family ==
- Great-grandfather — Andrei Mineyevich Kudryavtsev (1768–1865), a carpenter, originally from the village of Nikolo-Zalesya, Soligalichsky district, Kostroma province. He took on contracts in St. Petersburg, participating in the construction of the Kazan Cathedral.
- Grandfather — Galaktion Andreyevich Kudryavtsev (1802–1867), construction contractor assigned to the city of Villmanstrand (Lappeenranta), subject of the Grand Duchy of Finland; took large orders for construction in St. Petersburg and Old Finland (Vyborg province). In St. Petersburg, he built the Church of St. Mitrophan of Voronezh at the Mitrofaniyevsky Cemetery (architect Konstantin Thon), in which an independent chapel was built at the expense of the Kudryavtsev family (1858).
- Grandmother — Yevgenia Trifonovna Kudryavtseva (? — 1907), buried in the family crypt near Luga.
- Uncle — Sergei Galaktionovich Kudryavtsev, architect.
- Father — Nikolai Galaktionovich Kudryavtsev (2 February 1856—19 July 1941), architect, designer of many residential and industrial buildings in St. Petersburg, as well as the Kazan Cathedral in Luga, the Holy Trinity Church on his own estate near Luga, the parish building schools in the Cheremenets Monastery. He was buried in Helsinki in an Orthodox cemetery in the Lapinlahti area.
- Brother — Andrei Nikolaevich Kudryavtsev (30 May 1901—10 January 1985), architect, priest, rector of the Church of the Intercession in Helsinki. He graduated from the correspondence construction institute, but was not allowed to defend his diploma due to foreign citizenship. In 1936 he went to Finland, where he worked as a factory worker and later as a design engineer. At retirement age he was ordained to the priesthood.
- Brother — Mikhail Nikolaevich Kudryavtsev. He was the only one in the family to accept Soviet citizenship in the 1920s.
