= Valamon Viiniherman =

Valamon Viiniherman Oy
- Headquarters: Finland
- Products: Wine, whisky
- Owner: Valamo Monastery

Valamon Viiniherman Oy (transl. Valamon Wine Herman) is a distillery located in Finland that produces whisky and church wine. The company, founded in 1997, is owned by the Valamo Monastery.

== History ==
The company was founded by the Valamo Monastery and a winery called Hermannin viinitila ("Hermann's Wine Estate") from Ilomantsi. The latter is the oldest wine estate in Finland, having been founded in 1989.

Valamon Viiniherman Oy was created by Father Andreas of the monastery.

In 2014, Valamon Viiniherman Oy launched the production of whisky, investing 1,2 million euros in the new venture destined to become the company's main stream of revenue. The first batch were planned for 2018. The distillery needed in the project forms a company of its own, and the majority of the shares is owned by the monastery. The person responsible for the production of alcoholic beverages in the monastery is Timo Kettunen.

In 2018, the winery lost its licence to sell its Church wine. Valamon provided 30% of the country's Church wine and had dropped the alcohol content of its wine below 15% for cheaper tax purposes. After losing its licence, the winery could not sell to parishes directly anymore, having to go through Alko for all sales, even when Valamon wanted to buy its own wine.

By 2019, the monastery was producing almost 50,000 liters of whisky and selling The Valamon Monastery Peated Single Malt in Alko stores.

== Activities ==
The company produces wines, liqueurs and whisky. Valamon owns half of Valamon Viiniherman Oy. It made €60 000 in profits in 2012. The whisky is sometimes aged in barrels used for Church wine, giving the liquid a distinct darker tone.
