= Kermajärvi =

Lake in the country of Finland

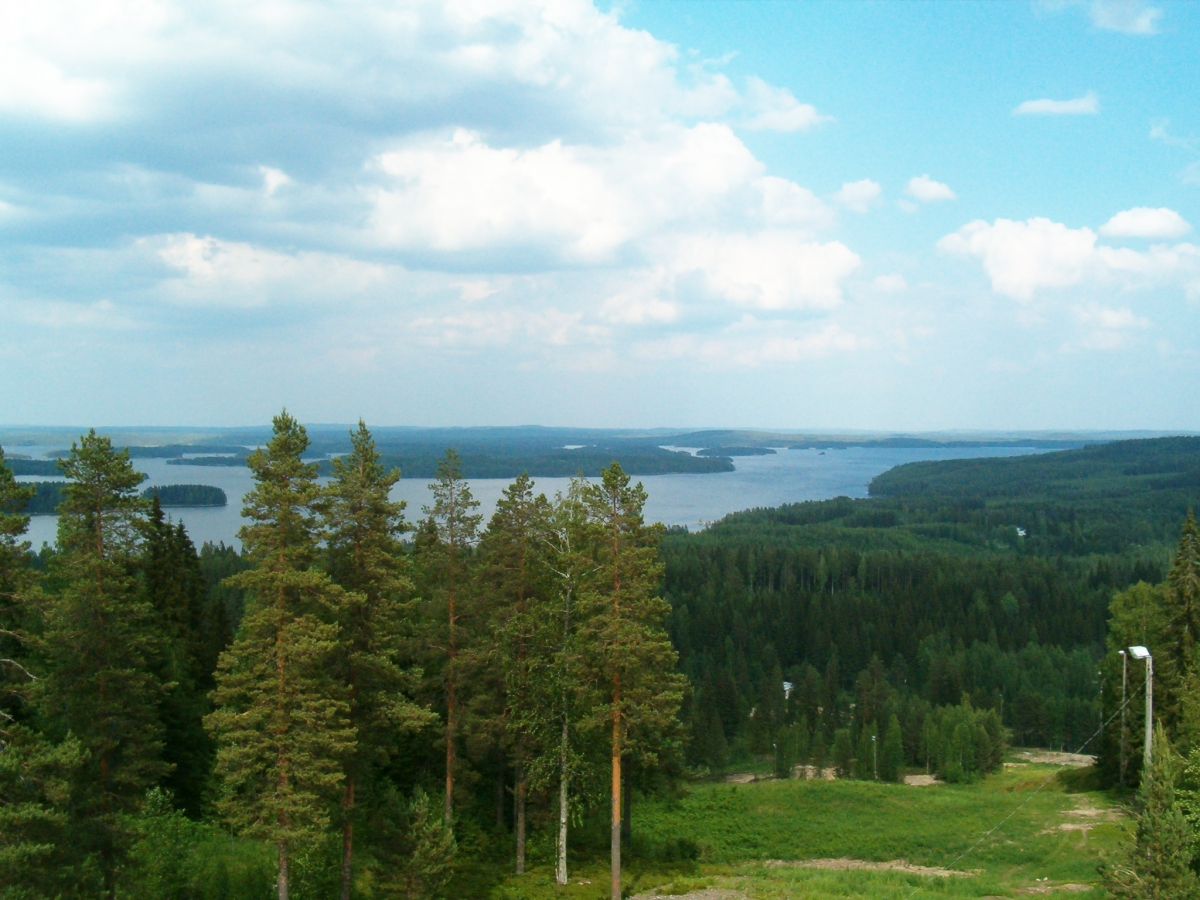
- As seen from Pääskyvuori 100 metres above the lake level

- Location within Finland
- Location: Heinävesi, Southern Savonia
- Coordinates: 62°27′N 028°42′E
- Primary inflows: Karvio Rapids, from Varisvesi (Kallavesi)
- Primary outflows: Kerma Rapids, to Enonvesi
- Catchment area: Vuoksi
- Basin countries: Finland
- Max. length: 29 km (18 mi)
- Surface area: 85.57 km^{2} (33.04 sq mi)
- Average depth: 10.12 m (33.2 ft)
- Max. depth: 56.07 m (184.0 ft)
- Water volume: 0.866 km^{3} (702,000 acre⋅ft)
- Shore length^{1}: 452.55 km (281.20 mi)
- Surface elevation: 80.1 m (263 ft)
- Frozen: December–April
- Islands: Hentulansaari, Kurjenvarvas, Puumalansaari
- Settlements: Heinävesi
- ^{1} Shore length is not a well-defined measure.

Kermajärvi (literally Finn. kerma for cream, järvi for lake, Sámi. kierma for rare and threatened Finnish Forest Reindeer fawn, and/or old Eastern Finnish word kiermi for type of fishing net drying stand) is a medium-sized lake in the Vuoksi main catchment area. It is located in the region of Southern Savonia in Heinävesi. It is the country's 53rd largest lake with an area of 85.57 square kilometres (33.04 sq mi) and consists of a wide open lake with plenty of islands in both northwest and southeast parts of it and several long, narrow bays in both ends.

The lake gets its water from Varisvesi of Kallavesi by Karvio Rapids and flows through Kerma and Vihovuonne Rapids to Ruokovesi which flows through Pilppa Rapids to Haukivesi of Saimaa. Kermajärvi is the main lake of Heinävesi Route, one of the two routes which Lake Kallavesi flows through to Saimaa (the other being Leppävirta Route). All the four rapids can be evaded with canals built around the turn of the 19th and 20th centuries named after the adjacent rapids. Farthest extension of the lake from northwest to southeast is some 29 kilometres (18 mi). The northwest–southeast form shows the orientation of the moving Glacier in the latest Ice Age.

Heinävesi parish village is located on the southern shore of the lake.

A big part of the lake is protected in Natura 2000 conservation program (code FI0500011).

A map showing the position of Kermajärvi in the middle of Heinävesi

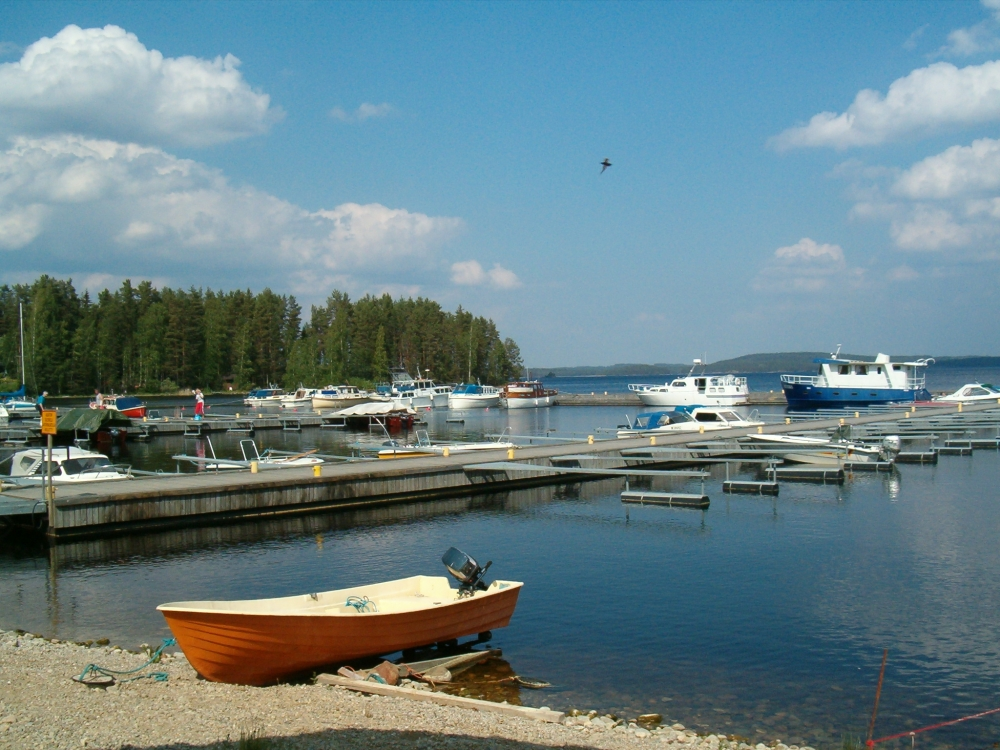
Kermajärvi at Heinävesi harbour

== See also ==
- List of lakes in Finland
