= List of Christian monasteries in Finland =

This is an incomplete list of Christian monasteries and religious houses, both extant and dissolved, in Finland, for both men and women.

== Catholic ==
=== Dissolved ===
- Dominican Priory, Turku (Turun dominikaanikonventti, Pyhän Olavin dominikaanikonventti), dedicated to Saint Olaf; founded by Swedish Dominicans in 1249; closed in the Reformation in 1529, and destroyed by fire in 1537
- Dominican Priory, Vyborg (Viipurin dominikaanikonventti); founded 1392; dissolved in the Reformation in the late 1530s
- Franciscan Friary, Vyborg (Viipurin fransiskaanikonventti); Franciscan friary, first mentioned in 1403; dissolved in the Reformation in the late 1530s
- Franciscan Friary, Rauma (Rauman fransiskaanikonventti), Rauma, Satakunta; founded probably in the 14th century but first recorded in 1449; dissolved during the Reformation in 1538
- Franciscan Friary, Kökar (Kökarin fransiskaanikonventti), Hamnö island, Kökar, Åland; founded in the 14th or 15th century but first recorded in 1472, dissolved during the Reformation by 1539
- Nådendal Abbey (Naantalin luostari; Swedish: Nådendals kloster), Naantali, Southwest Finland; Bridgettine abbey (the first religious house for women in Finland) founded in 1438; dissolved in the Reformation but not finally wound up until 1591
- Monastery of Our Lady of Mount Carmel in Finland (Jumalanäidin karmeliittaluostari), Espoo; Carmelite nunnery founded in 1988; closed in 2021

=== Extant ===
- Bridgettine monastery, Turku (Turun birgittalaisluostari); Bridgettine nunnery founded in 1986

== Eastern Orthodox ==
=== Old Believers ===
- Pahkalampi Monastery (Pahkalammen luostari) in Pahkalampi, Vuottoniemi, in Ilomantsi, North Karelia; founded 1798 by Marki Alexandrov for monks and also later nuns of the Old Believers fleeing persecution in Russia; abandoned by 1880
- Megrijärvi Monastery, also Megri (Megrijärven luostari), in Ilomantsi, North Karelia, on the Russian border; founded c.1800 by Onefrei for Old Believers fleeing persecution in Russia, initially for monks, but from 1850 also for nuns; the state acquired the property in 1914 and the last resident, a nun, left in 1919
- Pyötikkö Monastery (Pyötikön luostari) in Vuokko, Juuka, North Karelia; founded in 1847 for monks of the Old Believers fleeing persecution in Russia; closed 1890
- Tavajärvi Monastery (Tavajärven luostari) in Tavajärvi, Kuusamo; founded in the 1850s for monks of the Old Believers fleeing persecution in Russia after the destruction of the monastery at Tuoppajärvi in 1852; the last monks died in the 1920s

=== Finnish Orthodox ===
- New Valamo Monastery (Valamon luostari or Uusi-Valamo), Pappiniemi, Heinävesi, North Karelia; monastery of the Finnish Orthodox Church; founded after 1940 by refugee monks from the original Valaam Monastery (on the island of Valaam, now in Russia)
- Lintula Holy Trinity Convent (Lintulan Pyhän Kolminaisuuden luostari or Lintulan luostari), Heinävesi, North Karelia; nunnery of the Finnish Orthodox Church; founded 1895 in Kivennapa (now in Russia); refounded in Heinävesi in 1946
- Pokrova Community (Pokrovan yhteisö), Kirkkonummi, Uusimaa; monastic community (without the formal status of a monastery) of the Finnish Orthodox Church; founded 1995 in the former Dannedbrog farm by the monk Hariton Tuukkanen

== Lutheran ==
- Monastic Community of Enonkoski (Enonkosken luostari), Ihamaniemi, South Savo; Lutheran monastic community / retreat centre founded in 1994

== See also ==
- List of Christian monasteries in Denmark
- List of Christian monasteries in Norway
- List of Christian monasteries in Sweden
