= Suurijärvi =

Lake in Finland

- Location within Finland
- Coordinates: 62.48°N 29.13°E
- Type: Lake
- Catchment area: Vuoksi
- Basin countries: Finland
- Surface area: 15.621 km^{2} (6.031 sq mi)
- Average depth: 5.57 m (18.3 ft)
- Max. depth: 26.3 m (86 ft)
- Water volume: 0.0871 km^{3} (70,600 acre⋅ft)
- Shore length^{1}: 66.14 km (41.10 mi)
- Surface elevation: 112.8 m (370 ft)
- Frozen: December–April
- Islands: Sallisensaari
- Settlements: Heinävesi, Liperi
- ^{1} Shore length is not a well-defined measure.

Suurijärvi is a medium-sized lake in the Vuoksi main catchment area. It is located in the regions North Karelia and Southern Savonia in Finland. The name Suurijärvi means Big Lake. There are 32 lakes with the same name in Finland. This one is the biggest of them.

== See also ==
- List of lakes in Finland
