= Varistaipale canal =

Canal in Heinävesi, Finland

Coordinates: 62.549°N 28.639°E

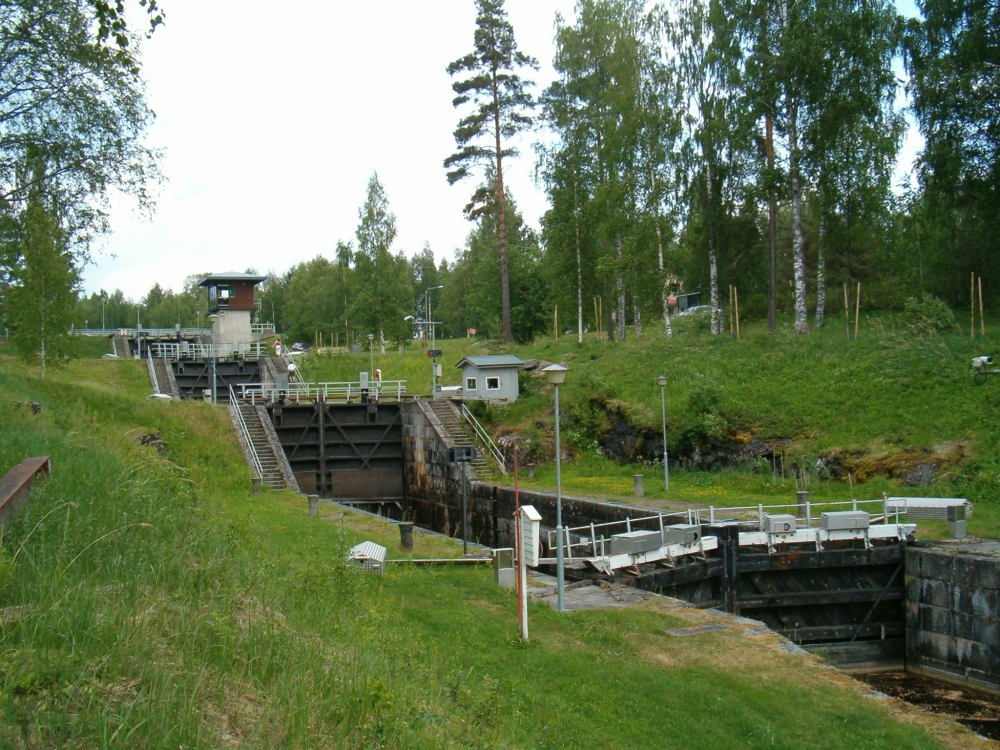
Varistaipale canal

Varistaipale canal (Finnish: Varistaipaleen kanava) is a Finnish canal in Heinävesi. It is another of the canals which connects Juojärvi to Varisvesi. The canal is a part of Heinävesi route (Heinäveden reitti), a route with six canals: Kerma, Vihovuonne, Pilppa, Karvio, Taivallahti and Varistaipale canals. The canal was built in 1911–1913 and has four locks. It is the biggest canal in Finland being the only canal to have this many locks. The height of drop totals 14.5 metres (48 ft) and the length is 1,100 metres (3,600 ft).

Next to the canal there is a canal museum.

== See also ==
- Saimaa canal, the longest canal in Finland

== Sources ==
- Varistaipale canal (in Finnish)
- Heinäveden historia II (The History of Heinävesi II), 1989. (in Finnish)
