= Kuikka-Koponen =

Kuikka-Koponen (born Abel Koponen; December 1, 1833 in Heinävesi – December 12, 1890) was an illusionist and magician in folklore from Savo in Finland. He was a hypnotist and escapologist.

== Selected works ==
- Marjut Hjelt (toim.): Kuikka-Koponen: Tarinoita savolaisesta silmänkääntäjästä. 2. täydennetty painos. Folklore-sarja. Helsinki: Suomalaisen Kirjallisuuden Seura, 1998. ISBN 951-746-030-9. (in Finnish)
- Markku Turunen: Kuikka-Koponen (+näytelmäsovitus Savonlinnan kaupunginteatterille 1999). Gummerus, 1998. ISBN 951-20-5350-0. (in Finnish)
- Marjut Kivelä: Kuikka-Koponen. Suomalaisen Kirjallisuuden Seura, 1980. ISBN 951-717-224-9.
- Juttuja Kuikka-Koposesta, Lapatossusta Ym.. Kirjapaino Teho H:ki, 1944.
