= Lintula Holy Trinity Convent =

Lintula Convent
- Lintulan Pyhän Kolminaisuuden Luostari
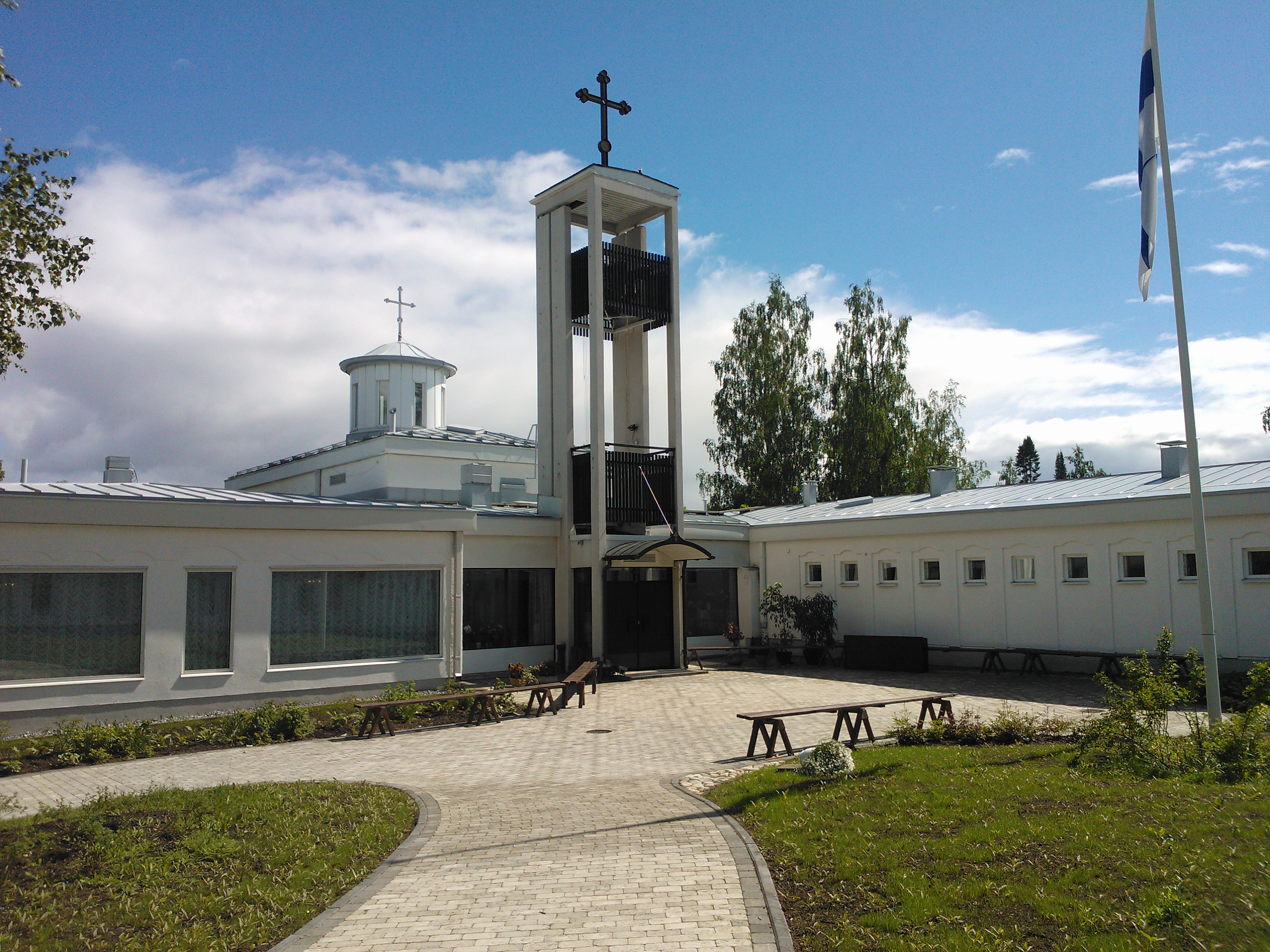
- Lintula Convent main Church.
- Interactive map of Lintula Convent

Monastery information
- Full name: Lintula Holy Trinity Convent
- Order: Byzantine monasticism
- Denomination: Orthodox Church of Finland
- Established: 1895
- Dedication: Holy Trinity
- Diocese: Diocese of Kuopio and Karelia
- Controlled churches: Church of The Holy Trinity

People
- Abbess: Abbess Ksenia
- Archbishop: Elia (Wallgrén)
- Bishop: Arseni (Heikkinen)

Architecture
- Status: Active
- Style: Modern

Site
- Location: Palokki, North Karelia
- Country: Finland
- Coordinates: 62.571°N 28.592°E
- Public access: Yes
- Website: https://www.lintulanluostari.fi

Lintula Holy Trinity Convent or Lintula Convent (Finnish: Lintulan Pyhän Kolminaisuuden luostari or Lintulan luostari; Russian: Ли́нтульский Свято-Троицкий монастырь) is a small Orthodox Christian convent located in Palokki, Heinävesi, Finland. The current leader of the monastery is Abbess Ksenia. The monastery is the only Orthodox nunnery in the Nordics.

== Establishment ==
The Lintula nunnery was originally founded in 1895 as a community of Russian nuns in Kivennava, Karelia, near the Russian border at the time.

The Lintula monastery in Kivennava started when the privy councilor F. P. Neronov donated a farm from Karjalankannas in the village of Lintula in Kivennava to establish the monastery in 1894. Actually, this first phase of the women's monastery, the women's community of Lintula's Holy Trinity, was founded the following year. Since then, the community got the status of a monastery. Lintula monastery got its name from the nearby village and river. The establishment was not easy, because Finland still had legislation from the time of Swedish rule, which in many ways sought to secure the status of the Lutheran Church as the only state religion. The area where the monastery was planned was also predominantly Lutheran. Despite all the difficulties, the monastery was founded by the decision of the Holy Synod and with the consent of the Czar in the summer of 1895.

The monastery got its first residents from other monasteries, for example from the city of Mokshan in Penza Governorate, but also from other parts of Russia. Life in the monastery at the beginning of the 20th century was busy and modest. Internal conflicts and a poor financial situation also plagued the monastery.

At the beginning of the century, things were further complicated by the Russification efforts of Finland, in which the Orthodox Church and its monasteries had to be involved to a considerable extent. These included, among other things, the establishment of Russian schools for Finnish children.

== The Monastery in independent Finland ==
Finland's independence broke ties with the Russian Church and the Orthodox Church was nationalized. In this context, Russian schools were closed. The First World War, Russian Revolution and Finland's 1918 civil war made it difficult for Lintula to operate and sometimes even caused a famine. In addition to the sisterhood, the monastery had an orphanage. The nuns' citizenship caused problems. Almost all of them had Russian citizenship. They had to get permission from the Ministry of Education to stay in the monastery. After the school, the orphanage was also closed and the building was turned into a tourist lodge.

The monastery stubbornly persevered, securing the continuation of the monastery's life, but the Winter War that started in November 1939 interrupted all plans.

== Journey to Palokki ==
During the wars, the nuns evacuated to Savo. A total of 47 people had to leave the monastery before the outbreak of the winter war. Most of them traveled on foot in October from the monastery to Terijoki and from there by train to Maavesi village of Joroinen municipality. The evacuees thought they would only be leaving for a short time, but it turned out differently. Only a few objects were saved from the entire collection, such as the Jerusalem Mother of Go icon taken by nun Nina at the last minute on 11 October 1939, which is today considered one of the miracle-working icons of the Finnish Orthodox Church.

In Maavesi the nuns were accommodated in different houses. The wish to return to Kivennava lived strongly in everyone's mind. In the early stages of the Winter War, a large part of the monastery's buildings were destroyed, and after the Continuation War, the sisters could once and for all forget about their return.

Ultimately in 1945 the sisters acquired the farm owned by Hackman & Co in the village of Koskijärvi in Heinävesi and the nuns moved to their new home in Palokki in January 1946.

== In Heinävesi ==
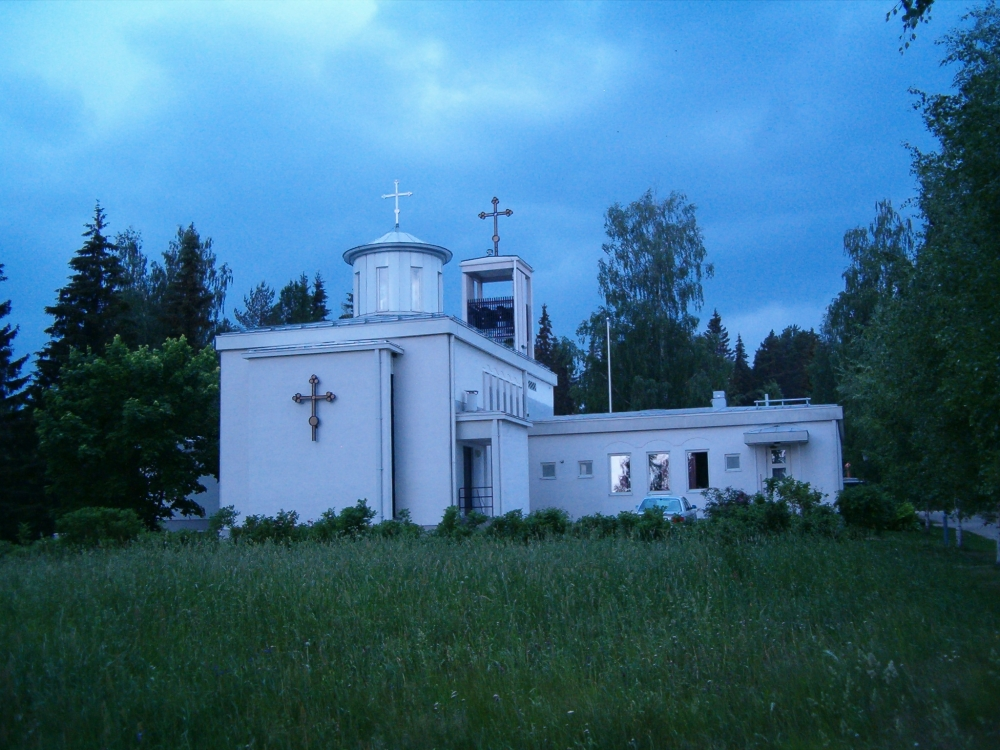
Church seen from behind.

The Lintula monastery has operated continuously in Heinävesi since 1946. The nearby New Valamo monastery took care of the spiritual needs of the sisterhood and there was cooperation in many practical matters as well. The inhabitants of Valamo were also mostly Russian-speaking.

The 34 sisters who moved to Palokki were mostly Russians, but there were also Ukrainians, Karelians and one Estonian.

== The "Finnishization" of the monastery ==
With the new archbishop and the Finns who slowly came to the monastery, Lintula started to become Finnish little by little in the 1960s. In 1973, the monastery got a new church, but there was shortage of priests at times. In the 1970s and 1980s, new sisters arrived at the monastery and activities revived both in Lintula and New Valamo monastery.

At first, the monastery received income and sustenance from agriculture and to some extent from tourism. In terms of food, the monastery was largely self-sufficient until the early 1970s.

== The years of reconstruction ==
In the fall of 1966, the monastery's residential building, funded and implemented as a collaboration of many different parties, was completed near the old mansion. The long-awaited Lintula monastery church was completed in the fall of 1973. The church was designed by the architect Vilho Suonmaa. The church was dedicated to the Holy Trinity, just like the previous churches in Lintula. The church's altar icon is the Mother of God of the Sign, i.e. the orant icon, painted by Petros Sasaki. It is the largest of its kind in Finland.

In the fall of 1988, a building was completed near the dormitory, with a candle factory with warehouses and other maintenance facilities on the ground floor, and a spacious souvenir shop on the top floor. In the early 1990s, the dormitory of the sisterhood was expanded and the old one was renovated.

Originally, the sisters were buried in the Valamo cemetery, but the monastery got its own cemetery in 1994. The following year, a chapel was built next to the cemetery, which was modeled after the old Äänisniemi model. The chapel is dedicated to the Mother of God.

The main building of the monastery was repaired in 2011 and at the same time the heating system of the old manor was renewed. The church of Lintula monastery got new roof and wall paintings for its 40th anniversary in 2013.

In 2020, the Lintula monastery applied to Heinävesi municipality for a safety zone against the mining industry.

== The sisterhood of the monastery ==
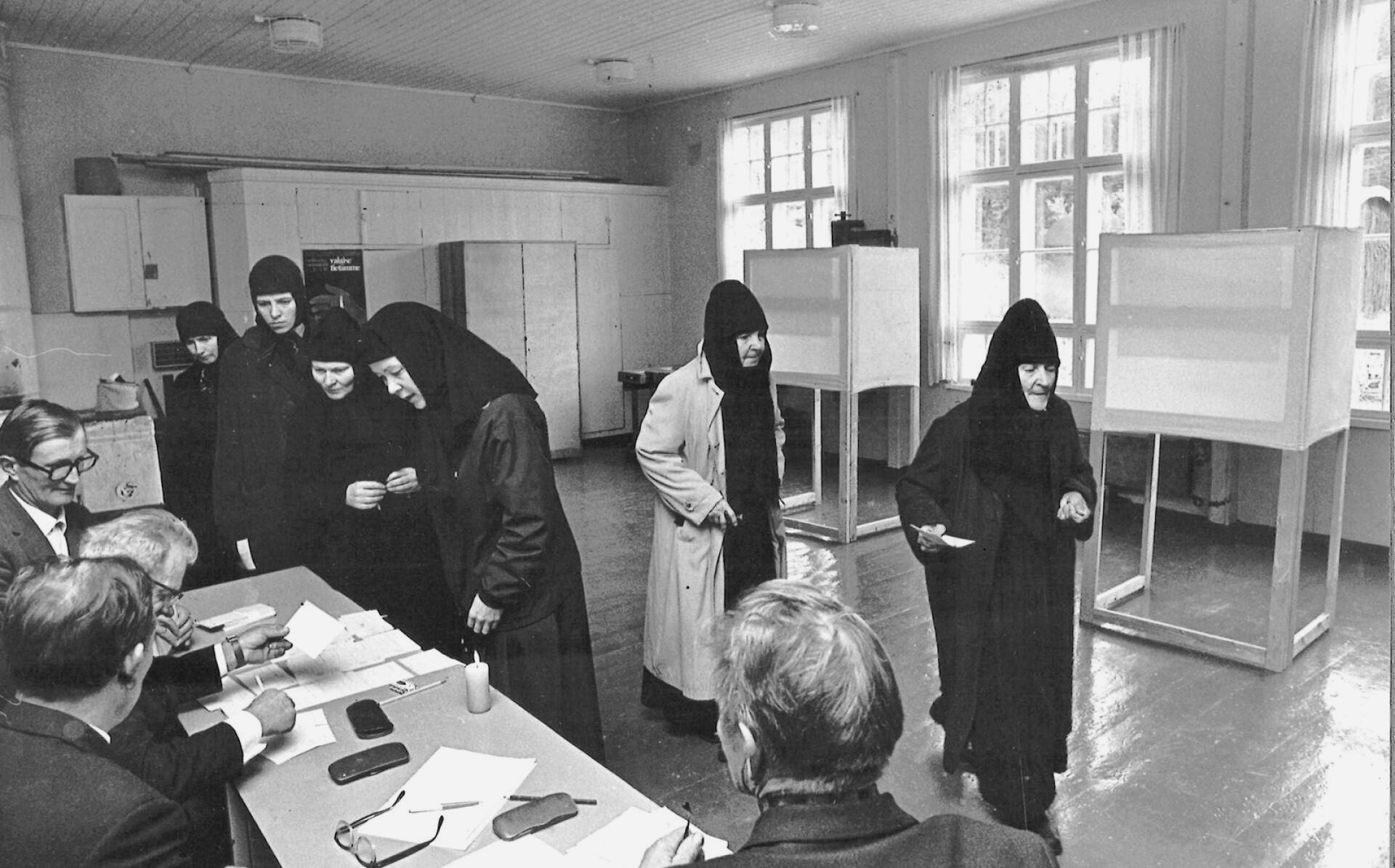
Lintula sisterhood voting in 1972.

The current sisters are all of Finnish origin. There are four degrees of competition in the monastery, which are novice, "cloak bearer" (Ryassophore), nun and schema nun.

The last nun to come from the old Lintula was Mother Abbess Antonina, who died in 1998, who came there as a young novice.

The most famous nun of Lintula monastery was nun Kristoduli, who has become famous for her spiritual books. She died in 2020.

In 2017 one of Lintula's nuns disappeared, and she has not been found.

In Lintula monastery, for the first time in a long time, in 2018, nun Taisia, who was named Melania, was tonsured to the great schema.

== Livelihood ==
With the end of the agriculture, the monastery had to look for new means of livelihood in addition to tourism to secure its maintenance. In 1967, the orthodox synod offered the establishment of a candle factory producing church candles to the whole church to Lintula, which accepted it. Ultimately it has come to the point that the making of candles no longer requires a large number of workers and manual labor, when machines handle a large part of the work. Candle making for the needs of the entire denomination today accounts for about half of the monastery's operating budget.

Agriculture was completely decommissioned in 2003–2004.

Tourism is a significant means of livelihood for Lintula monastery.

== Monastery leaders, abbesses ==
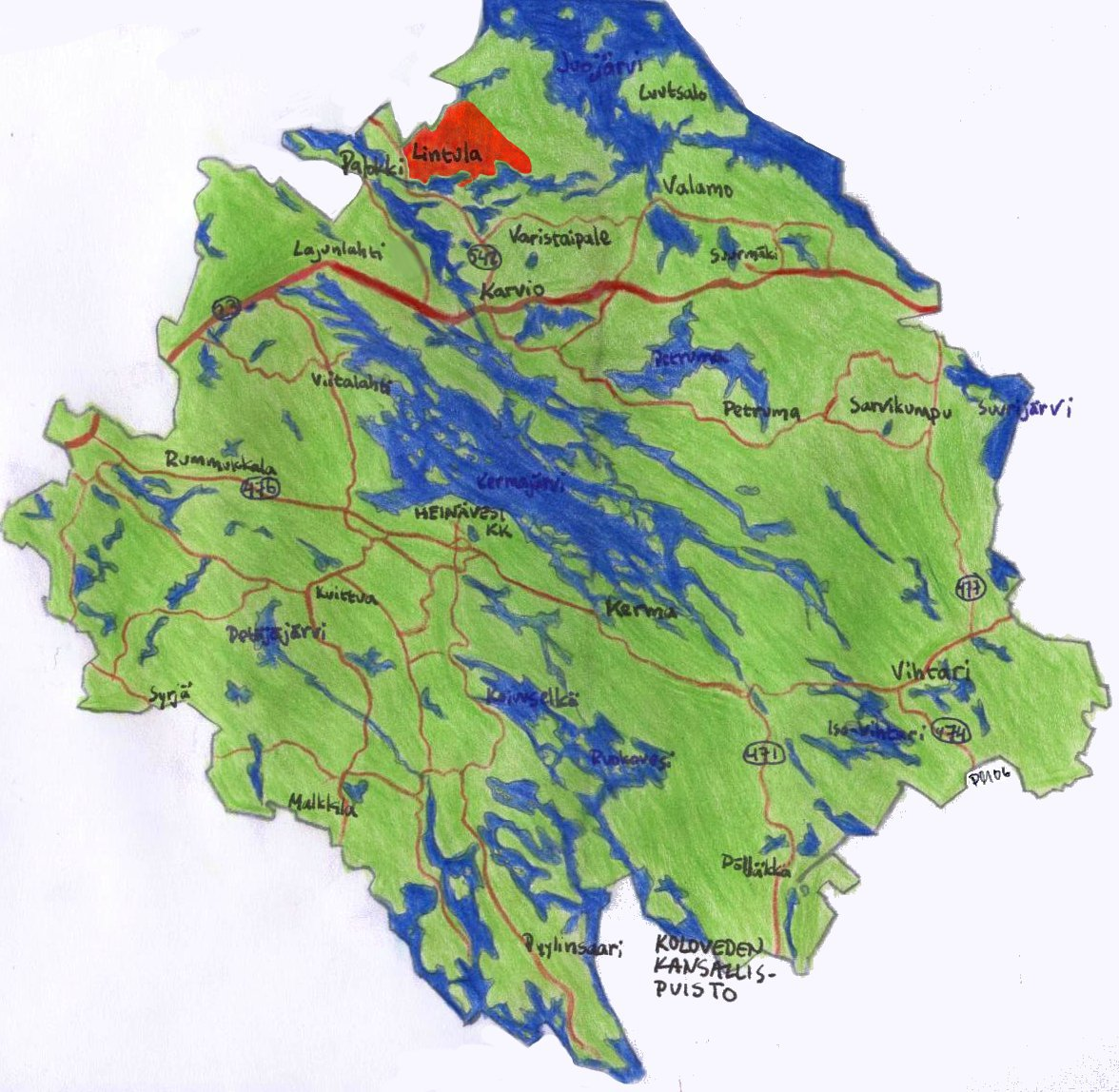
Location of Lintula monastery on Heinävesi map

- Headmistress Smaragda (1894–1898)
- Headmistress Florentia (1900–1901)
- Abbess Feokista (1901–1911)
- Abbess Dosifeja (1911–1916)
- Headmistress Olimpiada (1916)
- Headmistress Sergia (1916–1918)
- Abbess Larisa (1918–1931)
- Abbess Arsenia (1931–1961)
- Abbess Mihaila (1961–1974)
- Abbess Antonina (1974–1998)
- Abbess Marina (1998–2012)
- Abbess Mikaela(2012–2023)
- Abbess Ksenia (2023–

== See also ==
- List of Christian religious houses in Finland
