= Monastery of Our Lady of Mount Carmel in Finland =

Catholic monastery in Finland

Coordinates: 60°16′31″N 24°39′31″E

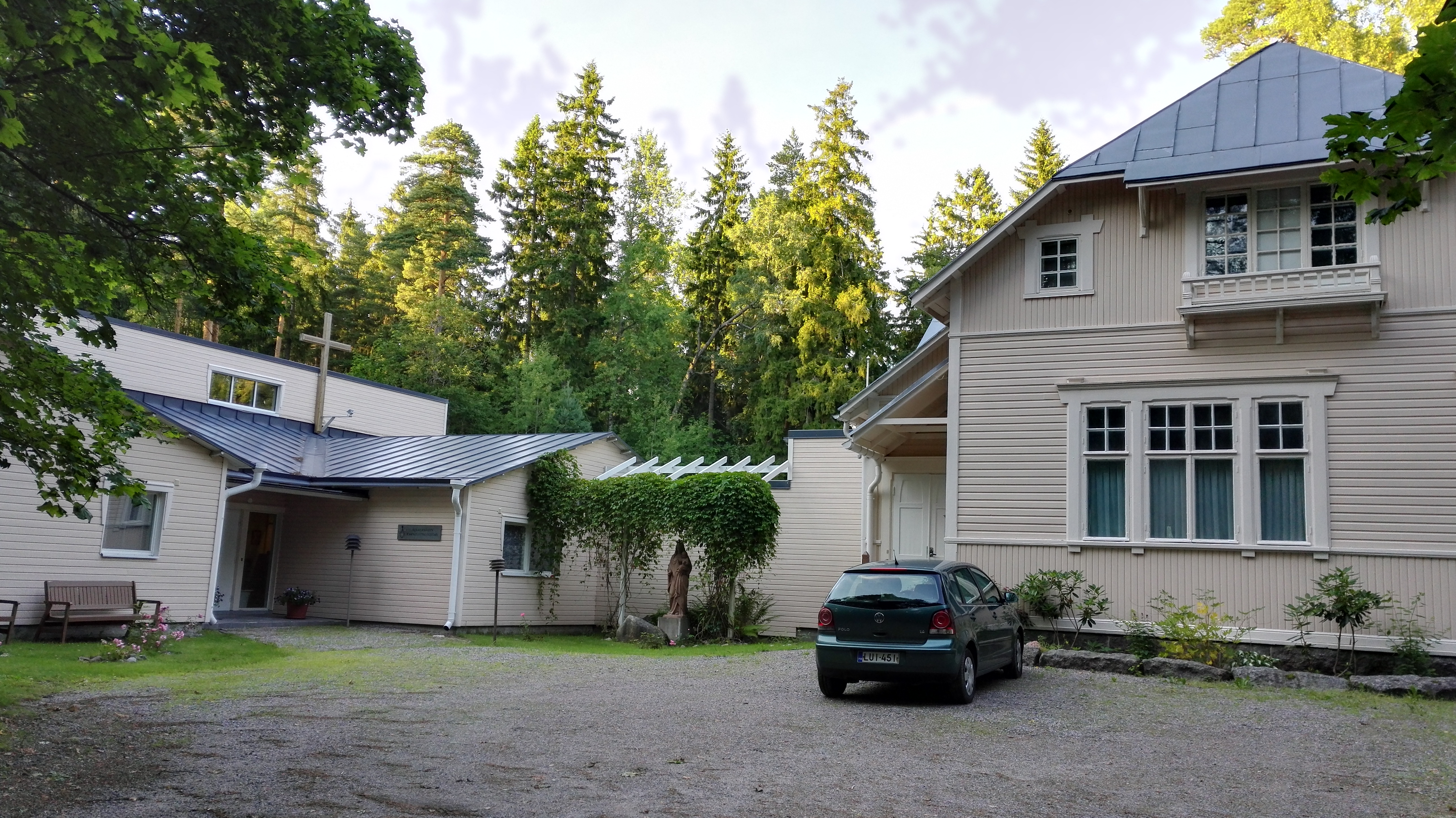
Monastery of Our Lady of Mount Carmel in Finland

The Monastery of Our Lady of Mount Carmel (Finnish: Jumalanäidin karmeliittaluostari; "the Carmelite monastery") was a small Catholic monastery of Carmelite nuns in Espoo, Finland, established in 1988 by sisters from the Carmelite monastery in San Rafael, California. The community latterly consisted of six nuns.

The last of the nuns left Finland in 2021, when the monastery was closed.

== See also ==
- List of Christian monasteries in Finland
