= Enonvesi =

Lake in Finland

- Location within Finland
- Location: Southern Savonia
- Coordinates: 62°07′N 28°54′E
- Lake type: Natural
- Catchment area: Vuoksi
- Basin countries: Finland
- Surface area: 196.676 km^{2} (75.937 sq mi)
- Shore length^{1}: 1,310.17 km (814.10 mi)
- Surface elevation: 75.8 m (249 ft)
- Islands: Muuraissaari
- Settlements: Enonkoski
- ^{1} Shore length is not a well-defined measure.

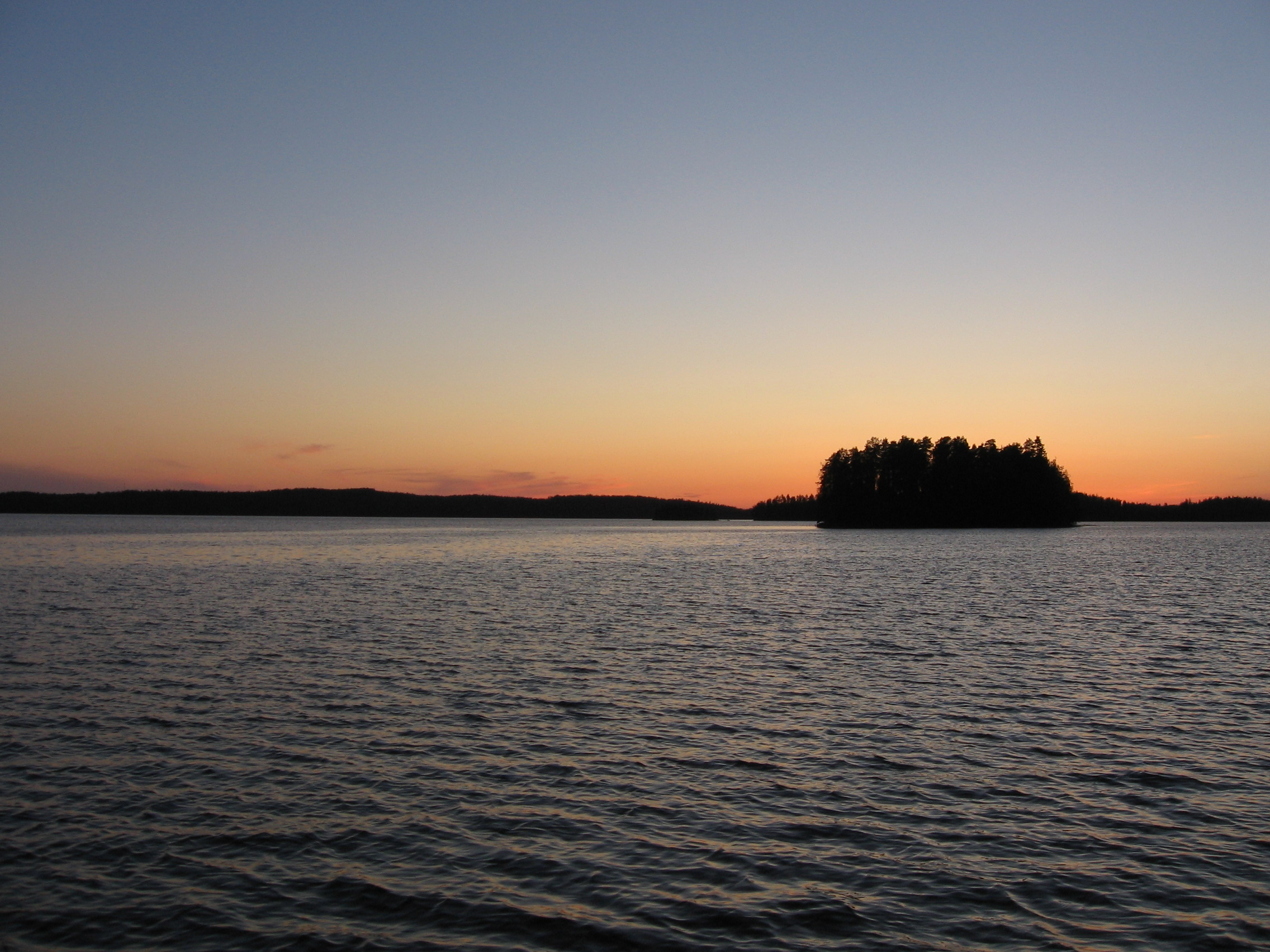

Enonvesi is a rather large lake in the Vuoksi main catchment area. It is located in the regions of Southern Savonia and Northern Savonia in Finland. It is a part of the Saimaa lake system.
