= New Valamo =

Monastery in Heinävesi, Finland

Coordinates: 62°33′47″N 028°47′26″E

- Kristuksen kirkastumisen luostari Uusi Valamo
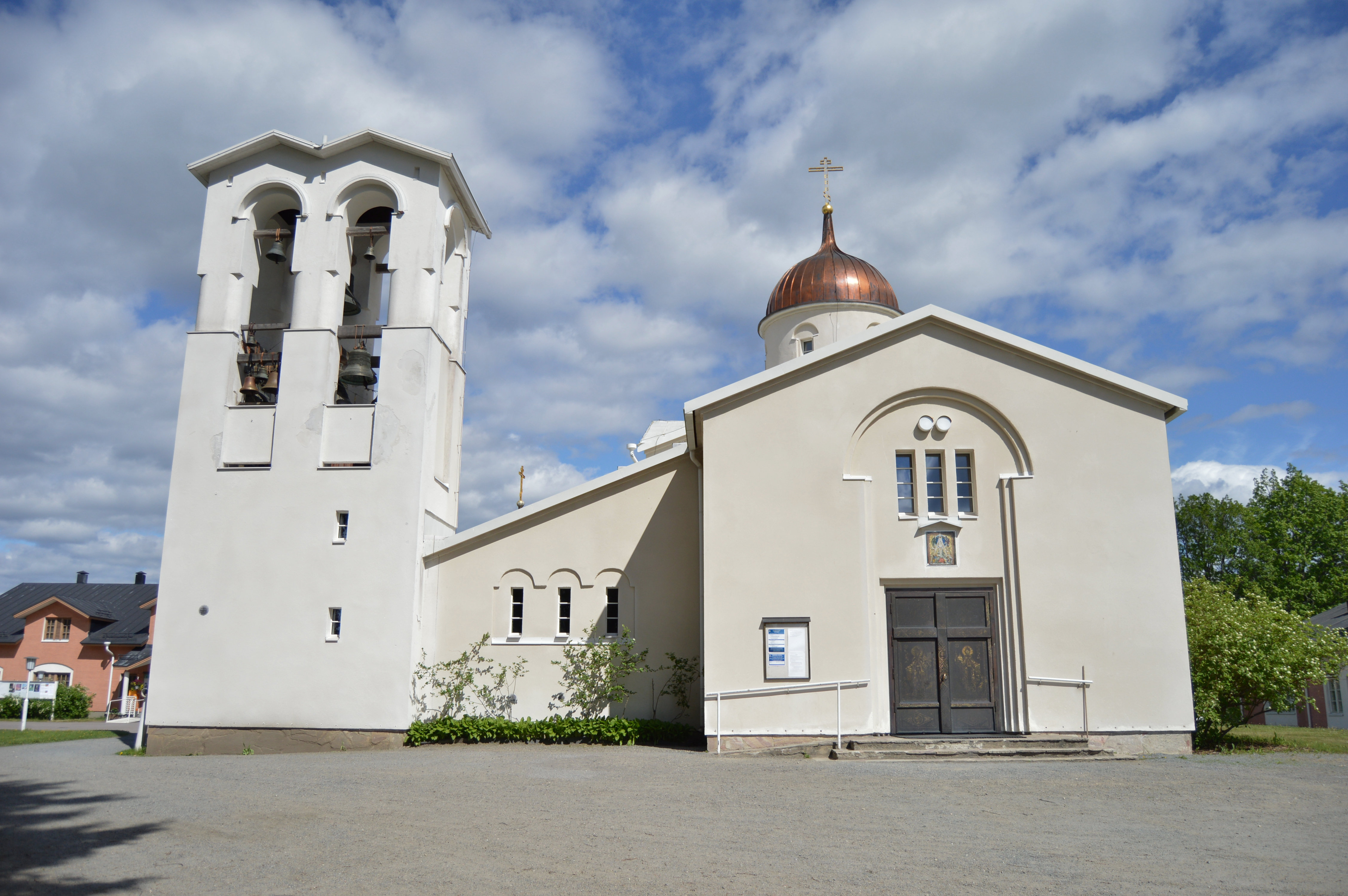
- New Valamo monastery main church
- Interactive map of New Valamo

Monastery information
- Full name: New Valamo Monastery of Transfiguration of Christ
- Order: Byzantine monasticism
- Denomination: Orthodox Church of Finland
- Established: 12th Century
- Reestablished: 1717
- Dedication: Transfiguration of Christ
- Diocese: Diocese of Kuopio and Karelia
- Controlled churches: Church of Transfiguration of Christ; Church of All Saints of Valaam; Church of sts. Sergius and Herman of Valaam

People
- Founders: Sergius and Herman of Valaam
- Abbot: Archimandrite Mikael (Nummela)
- Archbishop: Elia (Wallgrén)
- Bishop: Metropolitan Arseni (Heikkinen)
- Important associated figures: John of Valamo

Architecture
- Status: Active
- Style: North Russian

Site
- Location: Heinävesi, North Karelia
- Country: Finland
- Public access: yes
- Website: Official website

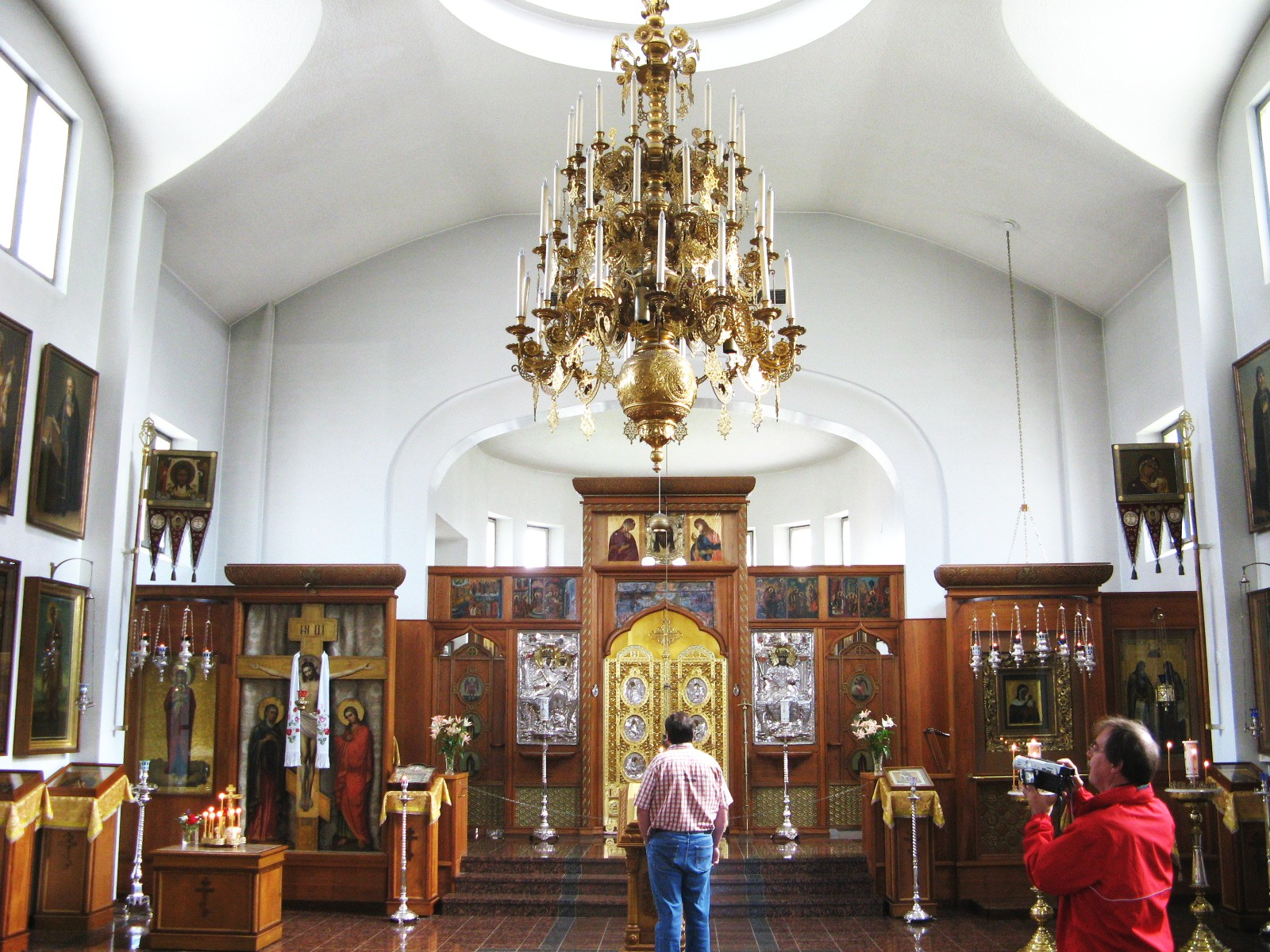
Inside the main church at New Valamo with the old iconostasis

New Valamo or New Valaam (Finnish: Valamon luostari, or more informally, especially in the postal address: Uusi-Valamo, Swedish: Valamo nya kloster, Russian: Ново-Валаамский) is an Orthodox monastery in Heinävesi, Finland. The monastery was established in its present location in 1940. However, the tradition of the Valamo monastery dates back to 1717. The monastery was then originally established on Valaam (also known historically by the Finnish name Valamo) which is an archipelago in the northern portion of Lake Ladoga, lying within the Republic of Karelia in the Russian Federation.

The New Valamo Monastery is now an active centre of the Orthodox religious life and culture in Finland and welcomes visitors throughout the year.

== History ==
In 1939, during the Winter War, some 190 monks from the Valamo Monastery in Karelia were evacuated from their old abode on a group of islands in Lake Ladoga in the Viipuri Province to present Eastern Finland. The old Valamo Monastery was occupied by the armed forces of the Soviet Union quite soon after the outbreak of the Winter War.

After a temporary dwelling place the monks decided to settle down in Heinävesi in Eastern Finland. The choice fell on a mansion in Papinniemi, Heinävesi, after the monks had found there, quite surprisingly, an icon of St. Sergius and St. Herman of Valaam, the founders of the monastery in the 12th century. The monks considered this to be a sign from God. Having received evacuees from the Konevsky (Konevitsa) and Pechenga (Petsamo) monasteries, it is now the only monastery for men of the Finnish Orthodox Church.

In 1977, in connection with the celebration of the 800th anniversary of Orthodoxy in Finland, the stone Transfiguration Cathedral was built in the monastery according to the design of the architect Ivan Kudrjavzev.

=== 2012 Fire ===
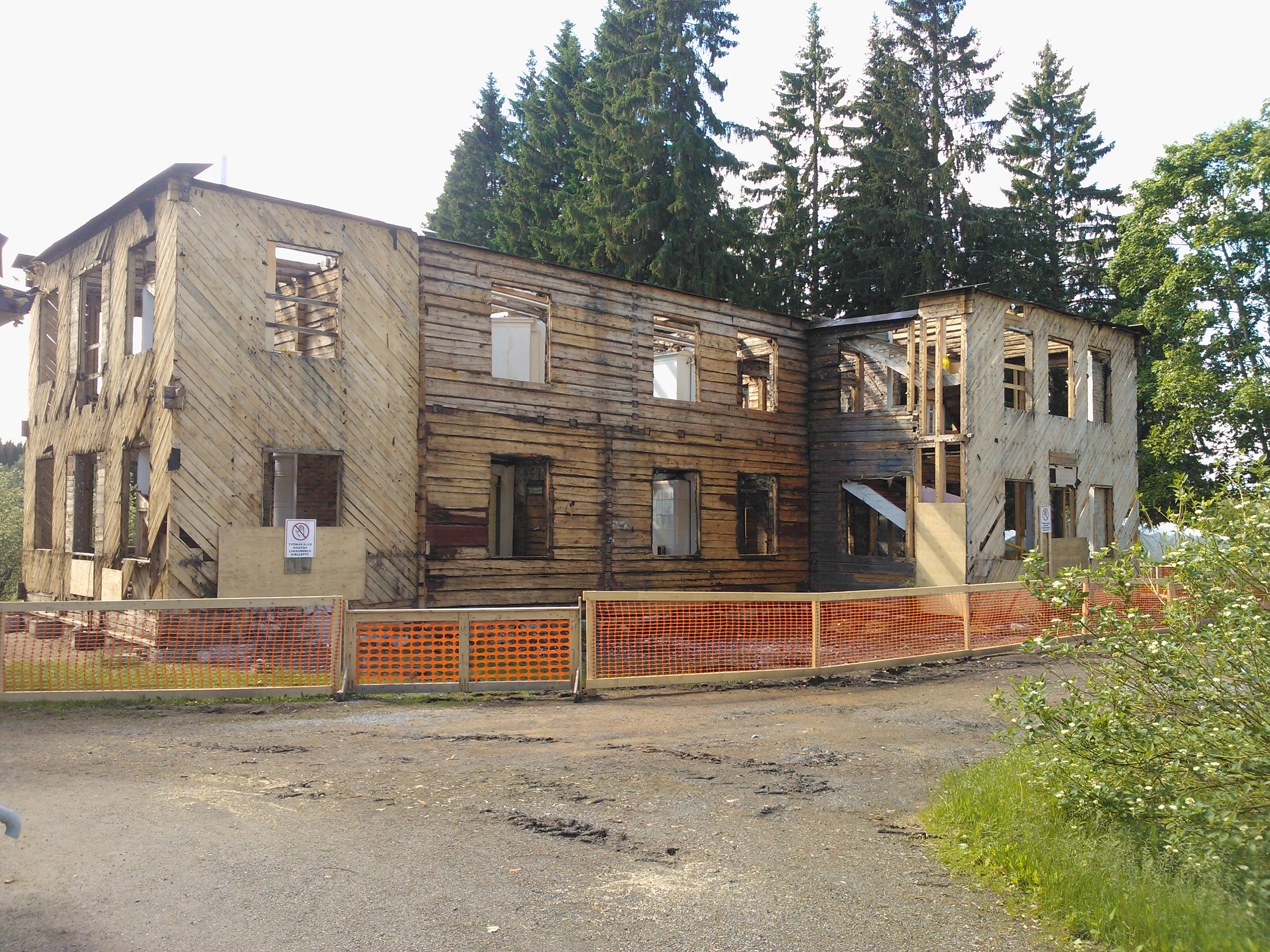
Deanery after the fire

In March 2012, there was a fire in the old main building of Papinniemi estate, which also served as the first main building of the monastery. The building had been built in 1840. The attic of the building was destroyed in the fire. It had been used as a storage space, and there were no valuables in it. All the valuable artifacts from the lower floors had been successfully removed during the fire, with the exception of the furniture. The furnaces of the building has been in poor condition, and their use had been prohibited for several years. However, one of the furnaces had been used for heating, and in a police investigation it was found that the fire had started from the cracks of the chimney. A couple of foreign extraction, who had been living in the building, were prosecuted in the Southern Savo Local Court. The court did not find sufficient evidence to back the claim that the furnace had been used for heating. The case was tried in December 2012.

The damages of the monastery amounted up to 1,6 million Euros. The State of Finland was ordered to pay some of the expenses of the man who had been accused of causing the fire.

== The miracle-working icons in Valamo ==
The best-known miracle-working icons at Valamo are those of the Mother of God of Konevitsa and the Mother of God of Valamo, both located in the main church.

== Monastery activities and economy ==
=== Economy ===
The monks of the New Valamo Monastery live a communal life of spirituality founded in the Ascetic tradition of the Orthodox Church. According to the ancient tradition, the monastery should support itself fully. At present, the main source of livelihood for the New Valamo Monastery is tourism: over 160,000 people visit the monastery each year, and all of the revenue goes directly towards the maintenance and development of the premises.

As a result of the financial crises 2008 the monastery too has had to face some financial challenges. This has led to for example co-determination procedures. During 2003-2013 the financial reports of the monastery have shown a surplus in two years. 2012 the result was positive mainly because 2012 the monastery received insurance reimbursements due to the fire incident in its main building.

2013 the monastery had debts of one million euros, and annual turnover reaching approximately 2,5m euro. The distillery operations of Valamo have shown healthy results every year, for example 2014 a surplus of 89.000 euros.

=== Monastery's distillery ===
The Christian faith is linked by tradition to wine and other alcoholic beverages. Alcoholic beverage making skills have been preserved and passed down within monastery wall for centuries. This tradition continues at the New Valamo Monastery.

The annual capacity of the Valamo distillery is 120,000 litres, and it is the biggest distillery in Finland. During 2014 and 2015 the operative distillery company Viiniherman Ltd has made additional investments of 1 million euros into the distillery. Viiniherman Ltd is owned by majority by the monastery and the distillery is located at the monastery's' premises.

They built a modern 500 square metre warehouse to Ilomantsi, Finland. So they will ship all of the whisky distillates from Valamo to Ilomantsi warehouse for maturation. Some of their whisky will have a church wine cask maturation, while some will be matured in bourbon casks. Valamo will produce peated and unpeated malt whisky. The capacity of the new warehouse is 450,000 liters and their current pot for whisky making is 1,000 liters, which allows for an annual production of 40,000 liters.

Valamo Beverages now produce a range of Gin, Menthe, Absinthe & their inaugural three year old Peated Single Malt Whisky followed by their second release, a five year old unpeated single malt aged in Bourbon & Wine Casks

=== 2016–2017 art sales ===
In 2016–2017, an art sale exhibition was organized at the Valamo Monastery in Heinävesi, curated by the then Bishop of Joensuu, Arseni (Heikkinen).

The owner of the works was stated to be an “Eastern Finnish family”, represented by a certain Jussi Savolainen. According to Helsingin Sanomat, Savolainen and his wife had acquired the key works in the exhibition in the 2000s. In the business records, the owner is Savolainen's wife's company. The monastery and the Philanthropy Association, which has been reported to be channeling the proceeds to the victims of the Syrian war, received a commission from the sales. The honorary chairman of the Philanthropy was Archbishop Leo (Makkonen). According to Turun Sanomat, the “family story” behind the exhibition is fabricated.

According to experts interviewed by Helsingin Sanomat, the works on sale did not represent the best of the artists’ production and were overpriced. Talk of “museum-quality” works was misleading buyers. According to Savolainen, auction houses do not know how to price art correctly. According to investigations by Helsingin Sanomat, the prices of the works were many times, even tens of times, those of the auction houses in previous sales.

According to research by the Finnish National Gallery, the graphic works by Picasso, Henri Matisse and Marc Chagall that were on sale as “test pieces” at the exhibition were counterfeit inkjet prints. According to Savolainen, 10–20 copies of the works were sold for around 80 000 euros.

In 2020, Savolainen and his wife were given suspended jail sentences by the North Savo Magistrate's Court. In 2021 the result of Savolainen's and his wife's trial at the Eastern Finland Hovrätt was the same. The wife tried to take the case to the Supreme Court, but the court refused to hear it.

== Hegumens of the monastery ==
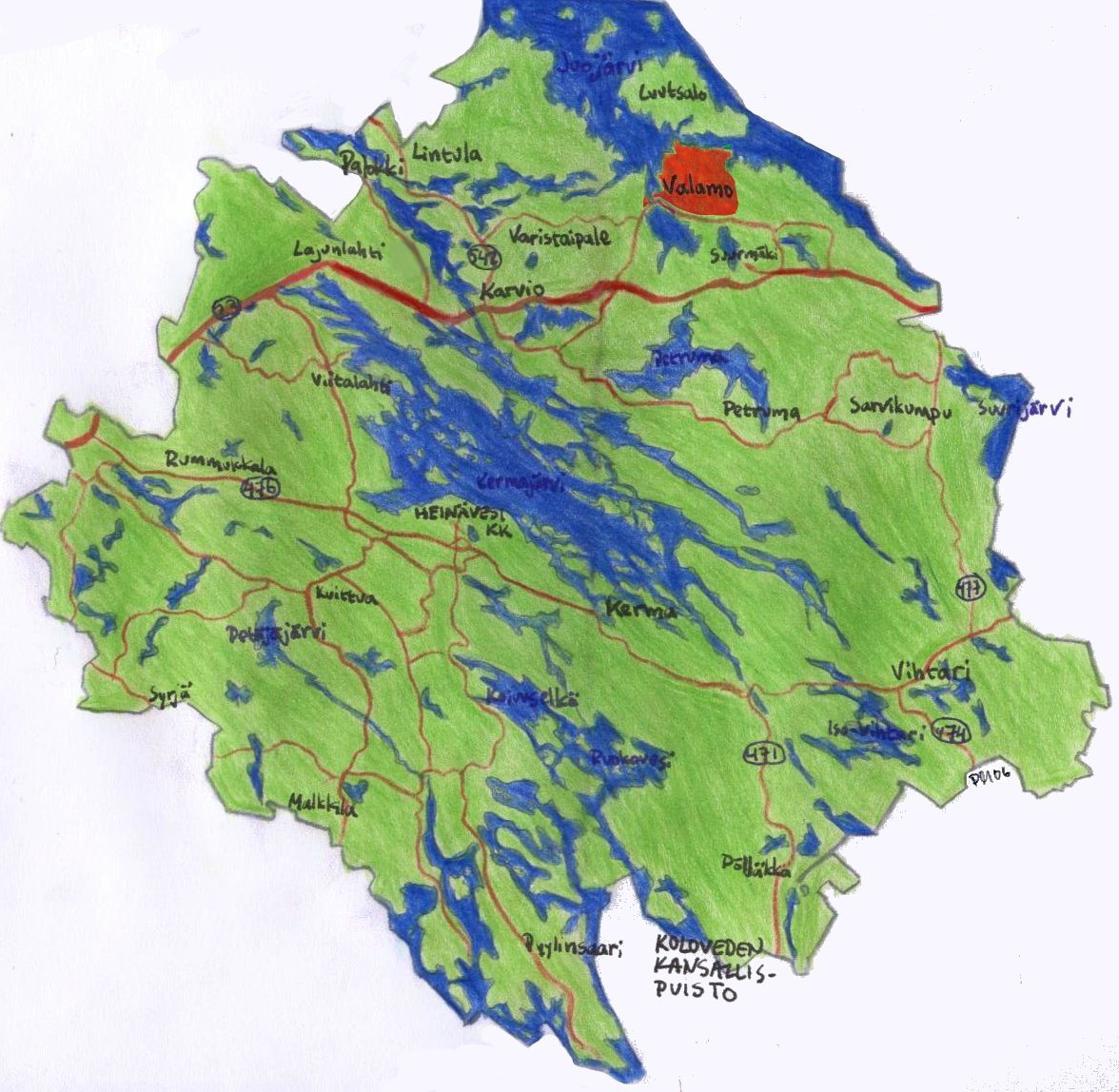
Location of Valamon Monastery in the Heinävesi municipality

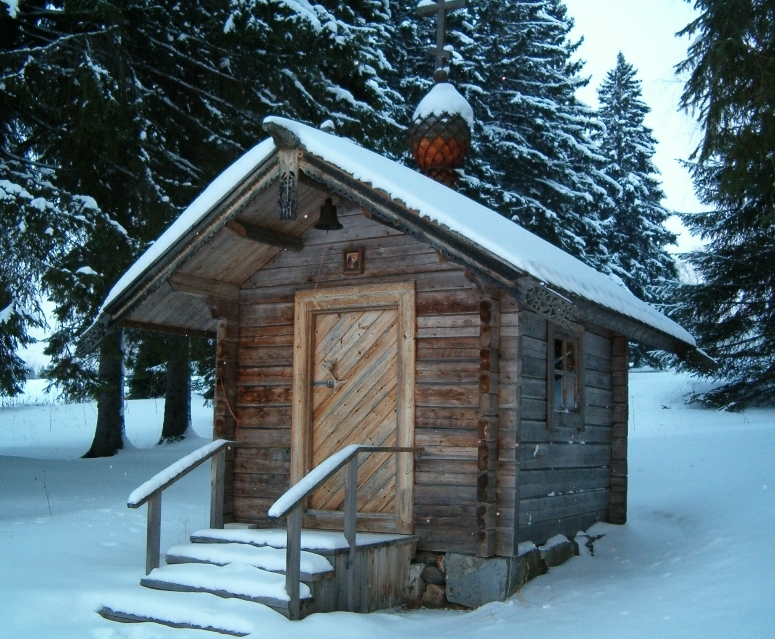
Chapel of Saint Nicholas, private eukteria of New Valamo

The following persons have served as hegumens (father superiors) of the monastery:

- Yefrem 1758–1781
- Nazary 1781–1801
- Innokenty 1801–1823
- Yonafan I 1823–1830
- Varlaam 1830–1833
- Veniamin 1833–1839
- Damaskin 1839–1881
- Yonafan II 1881–1891
- Gabriel 1891–1903
- Vitaly 1903–1905
- Pafnuty 1905–1907
- Mavriky 1907–1918
- Pavlin 1918–1933
- Chariton 1933–1947
- Yeronim 1948–1952
- Nestor 1952–1967
- Simforian 1969–1979
- Panteleimon 1979–1997 (later Metropolitan of Oulu, since 2013 retired)
- Sergei 1997–2011, 2012–2022 (later Bishop of Hamina, vicar bishop of the Helsinki Orthodox Diocese)
- Mikael 2022–

== See also ==
- List of Christian religious houses in Finland
- Lintula Holy Trinity Convent, Finnish Orthodox monastery for women, situated 18 kilometres (11 mi) from New Valamo, in Palokki, Heinävesi.
