= Heinävesi =

- Municipality
- Heinäveden kunta Heinävesi kommun
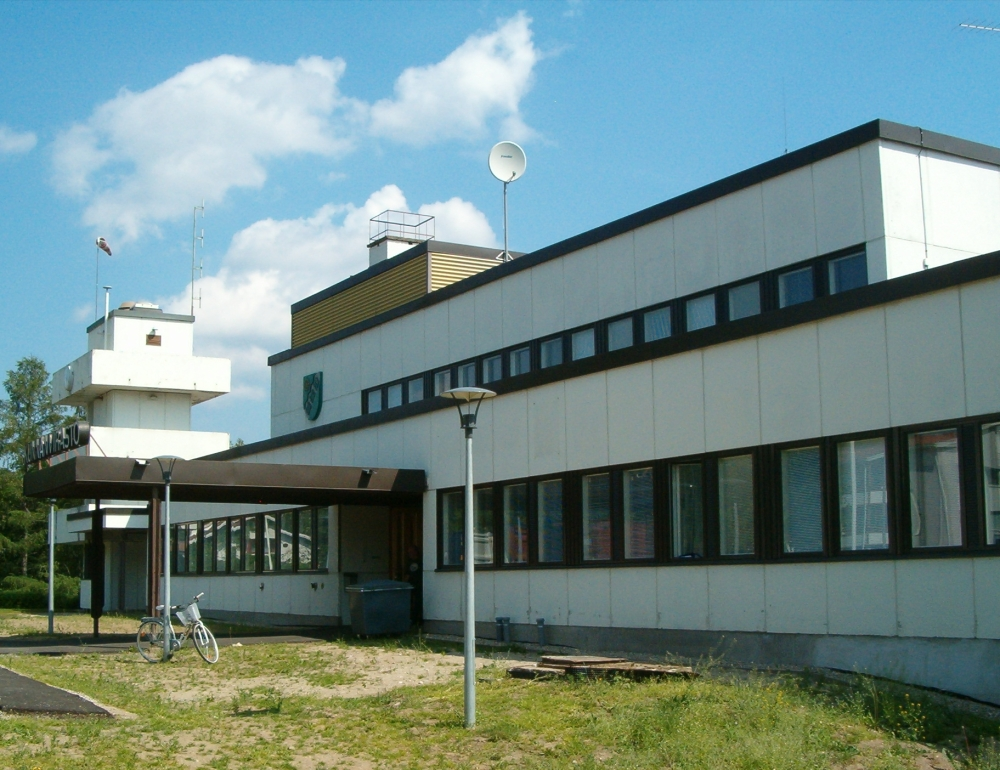
- Municipal office of Heinävesi

- Coat of arms

- Location of Heinävesi in Finland
- Interactive map of Heinävesi
- Coordinates: 62°25.5′N 028°38′E
- Country: Finland
- Region: North Karelia
- Sub-region: Joensuu
- Charter: 1869

Government
  - Municipal manager: Riitta A. Tilus

Area (2018-01-01)
  - Total: 1,319.58 km^{2} (509.49 sq mi)
  - Land: 1,029.96 km^{2} (397.67 sq mi)
  - Water: 288.71 km^{2} (111.47 sq mi)
  - Rank: 76th largest in Finland

Population (2025-12-31)
  - Total: 2,888
  - Rank: 217th largest in Finland
  - Density: 2.8/km^{2} (7.3/sq mi)

Population by native language
  - Finnish: 94.7% (official)
  - Others: 5.3%

Population by age
  - 0 to 14: 9.9%
  - 15 to 64: 51%
  - 65 or older: 39.1%
- Time zone: UTC+02:00 (EET)
  - Summer (DST): UTC+03:00 (EEST)
- Website: www.heinavesi.fi

Heinävesi (Finnish: [ˈhei̯næˌʋesi]; lit. 'hay water') is a municipality of Finland. It is located in the North Karelia region. The municipality has a population of 2,888 (31 December 2025) and covers an area of 1,319.58 square kilometres (509.49 sq mi) of which 288.71 km^{2} (111.47 sq mi) is water. The population density is 2.8 inhabitants per square kilometre (7.3/sq mi). Neighbouring municipalities are Savonlinna, Varkaus, Leppävirta, Tuusniemi, Outokumpu and Liperi. The city of Joensuu is located 81 kilometres (50 mi) northeast of Heinävesi. The municipality is unilingually Finnish.

In 2021, Heinävesi had its region reassigned from South Savo to North Karelia.

The only Orthodox Christian monasteries in Finland, the New Valamo Monastery and the Lintula Holy Trinity Convent, are located in Heinävesi.

== Notable people ==
- Tuomas Gerdt, last living Knight of the Mannerheim Cross
- Onni Happonen, politician and murder victim
- Kuikka-Koponen (real name Abel Koponen), illusionist and magician
- Minja Koskela, politician, musician and author
- Father Akaki, oldest living Finn at the time of his death

== Gallery ==
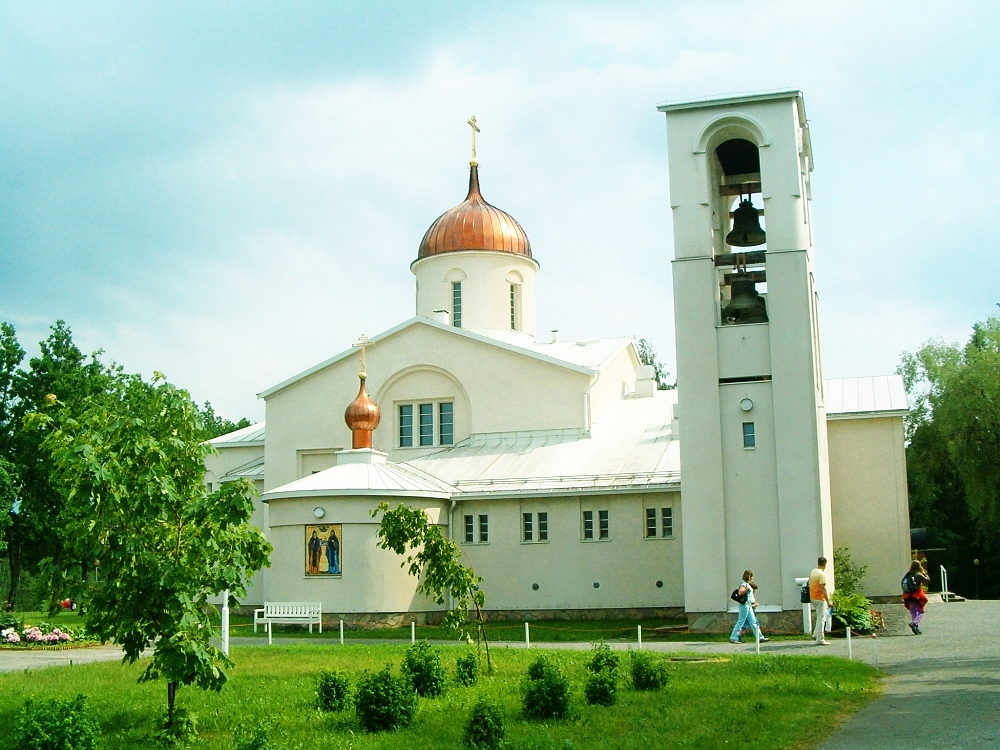
New Valamo Monastery

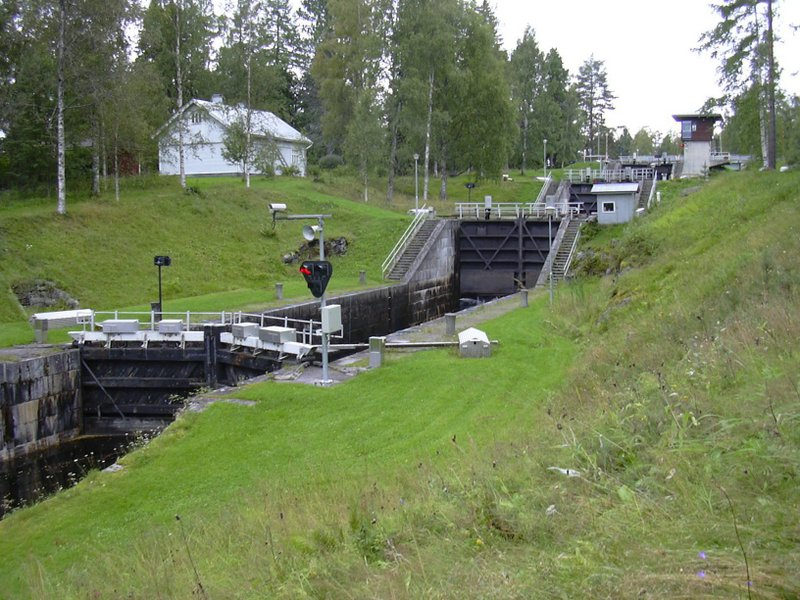
Varistaipale canal

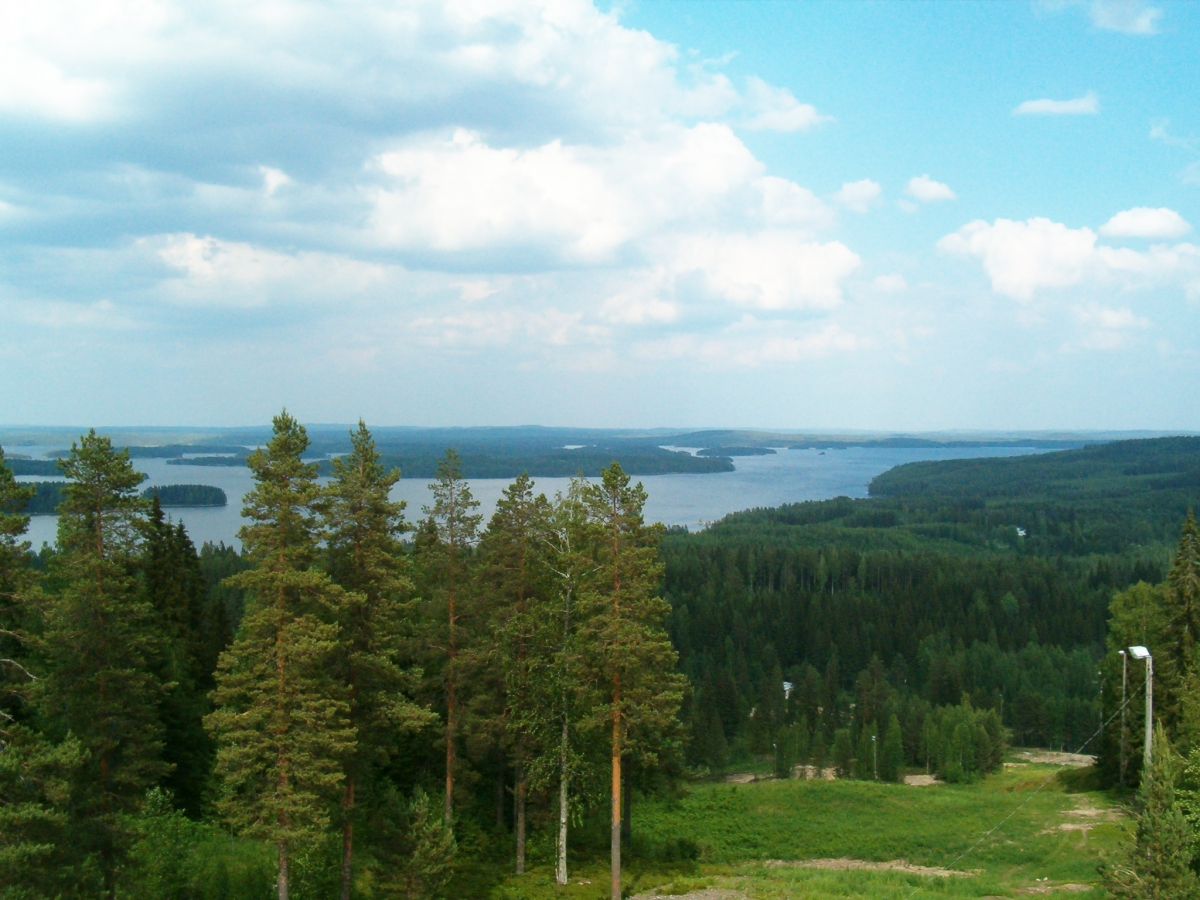
Lake Kermajärvi

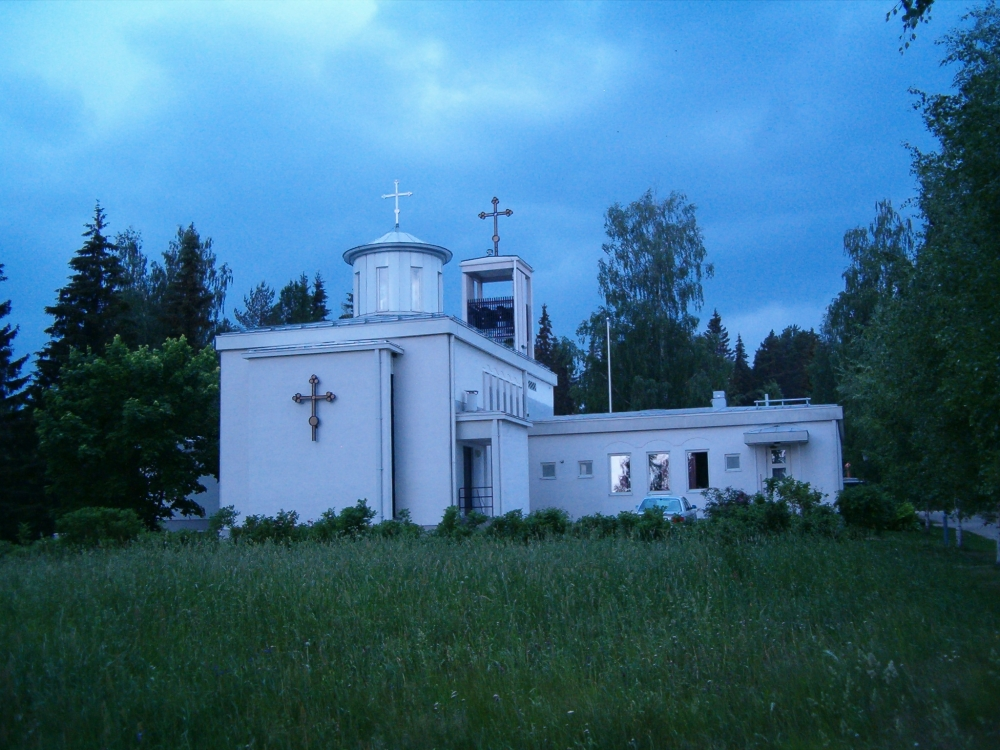
Lintula Holy Trinity Convent church
