= Aral Sea =

Lake in Kazakhstan and Uzbekistan

- Арал теңизи (Karakalpak); Арал теңізі (Kazakh); Аральское море (Russian); Orol dengizi (Uzbek)
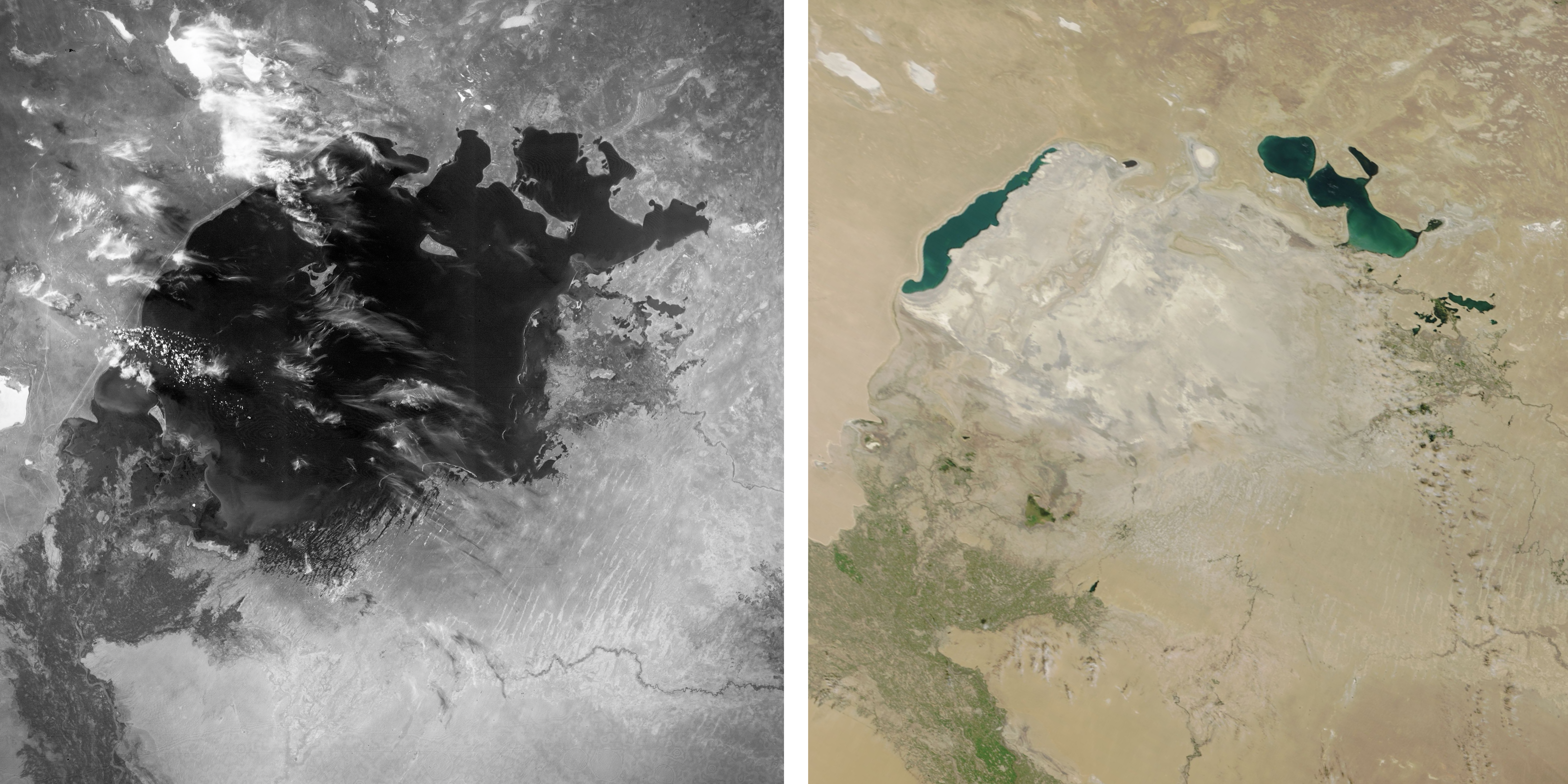
- The Aral Sea on August 22, 1964 (left) and August 25, 2026 (right)

- Location within West and Central Asia
- Interactive map of Aral Sea
- Location: Central Asia (Kazakhstan – Uzbekistan)
- Coordinates: 45°N 60°E
- Type: Endorheic, saline, natural lake, reservoir (North)
- Primary inflows: North: Syr Darya; South: Groundwater
- Catchment area: 1,549,000 km^{2} (598,100 mi^{2})
- Basin countries: List: Afghanistan; Iran; Kazakhstan; Kyrgyzstan; Tajikistan; Turkmenistan; Uzbekistan
- Surface area: 68,000 km^{2} (26,300 mi^{2}) (1960, one lake); 28,687 km^{2} (11,076 mi^{2}) (1998, two lakes); 17,160 km^{2} (6,626 mi^{2}) (2004, four lakes); North: 3,142 km^{2} (1,210 mi^{2}) (2018); South: 5,179 km^{2} (2,000 mi^{2}) (2018)
- Max. depth: North: 42 m (138 ft) (2008); 30 m (98 ft) (2003); South: 37–40 m (121–131 ft) (2005); 102 m (335 ft) (1989)
- Water volume: North: 21.4 km^{3} (5 mi^{3}) (2024)
- Surface elevation: North: 42 m (138 ft) (2011); South: 29 m (95 ft) (2007); 53.4 m (175 ft) (1960)

The Aral Sea (Note: English: /ˈærəl/ ARR-əl; Kazakh: Арал теңізі, romanized: Aral teñızı, pronounced [ɑrɑ́ɫ tʰʲeŋɘzɘ́]; Karakalpak: Арал теңизи, romanized: Aral teńizi, pronounced [ɑˈrɑɫ tʰeŋɪˈzɪ]; Uzbek: Orol dengizi, pronounced [ɒˈɾɒl deŋɪˈzɪ]; Russian: Аральское море, romanized: Araljskoje more, pronounced [ɐˈralʲskəjɪ ˈmorʲɪ]) was an endorheic salt lake lying between Kazakhstan to its north and Uzbekistan to its south, which began shrinking in the 1950s and had largely dried up into desert by 2007. It was in the Aktobe and Kyzylorda regions of Kazakhstan and the Karakalpakstan autonomous region of Uzbekistan. The name roughly translates from Mongolic and Turkic languages to "Sea of Islands", a reference to the large number of islands (over 1,100) that once dotted its waters. The Aral Sea drainage basin encompasses Uzbekistan and parts of Afghanistan, Iran, Kazakhstan, Kyrgyzstan, Tajikistan, and Turkmenistan.

Formerly the fourth-largest lake in the world with an area of 68,000 km^{2} (26,300 sq mi), the Aral Sea began shrinking in the 1960s after the rivers that fed it were diverted by Soviet irrigation projects. By 2007, it had declined to 10% of its original size, splitting into four lakes: the North Aral Sea, the eastern and western basins of the once far larger South Aral Sea, and the smaller intermediate Barsakelmes Lake. By 2009, the southeastern lake had disappeared and the southwestern lake had retreated to a thin strip at the western edge of the former southern sea. In subsequent years occasional water flows have led to the southeastern lake sometimes being replenished to a small degree. Satellite images by NASA in August 2014 revealed that for the first time in modern history the eastern basin of the Aral Sea had completely dried up. The eastern basin is now called the Aralkum Desert.

In a Kazakhstani effort to save and replenish the North Aral Sea, the Dike Kokaral dam was completed in 2005. By 2008, the water level had risen 12 m (39 ft) above that of 2003, to 42 m (138 ft). As of 2013, salinity had dropped, and fish were again present in sufficient numbers for some fishing to be viable.

After the visit to Muynak in 2010, United Nations secretary general Ban Ki-moon called the shrinking of the Aral Sea "one of the planet's worst environmental disasters". The region's once-prosperous fishing industry has been devastated, bringing unemployment and economic hardship. The water from the diverted Syr Darya river is used to irrigate about two million hectares (5,000,000 acres) of farmland in the Ferghana Valley. The Aral Sea region is heavily polluted, with consequent serious public health problems. UNESCO has added historical documents concerning the Aral Sea to its Memory of the World Register as a resource to study the environmental tragedy.

== Formation ==
The Amu Darya river flowed into the Caspian Sea via the Uzboy Channel until the Holocene, when its course changed to feed the Aral Sea from the south. Geographer Nick Middleton believes it did not begin to flow into the Aral Sea until that time. Today the Amu Darya does not reach the Aral Sea, and its mouth is in a dried-up area of what was once the Aral Sea.

== Ecology ==
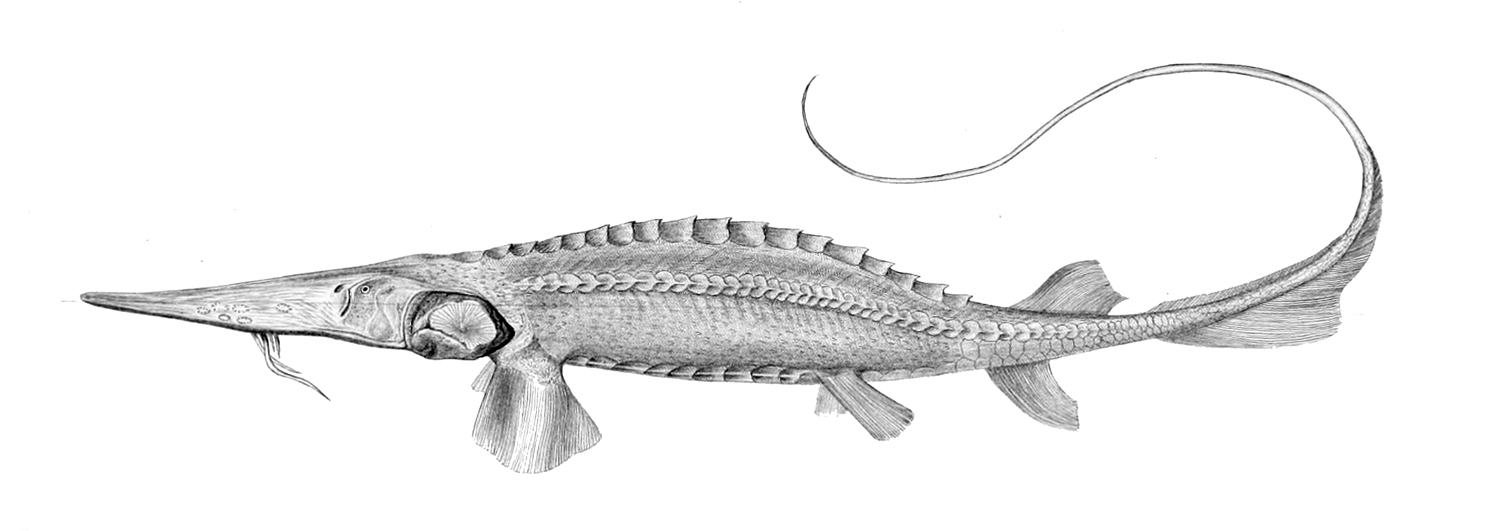
The Syr Darya sturgeon (Pseudoscaphirhynchus fedtschenkoi) was a species of fish possibly driven to extinction by the shrinkage of the Aral Sea.

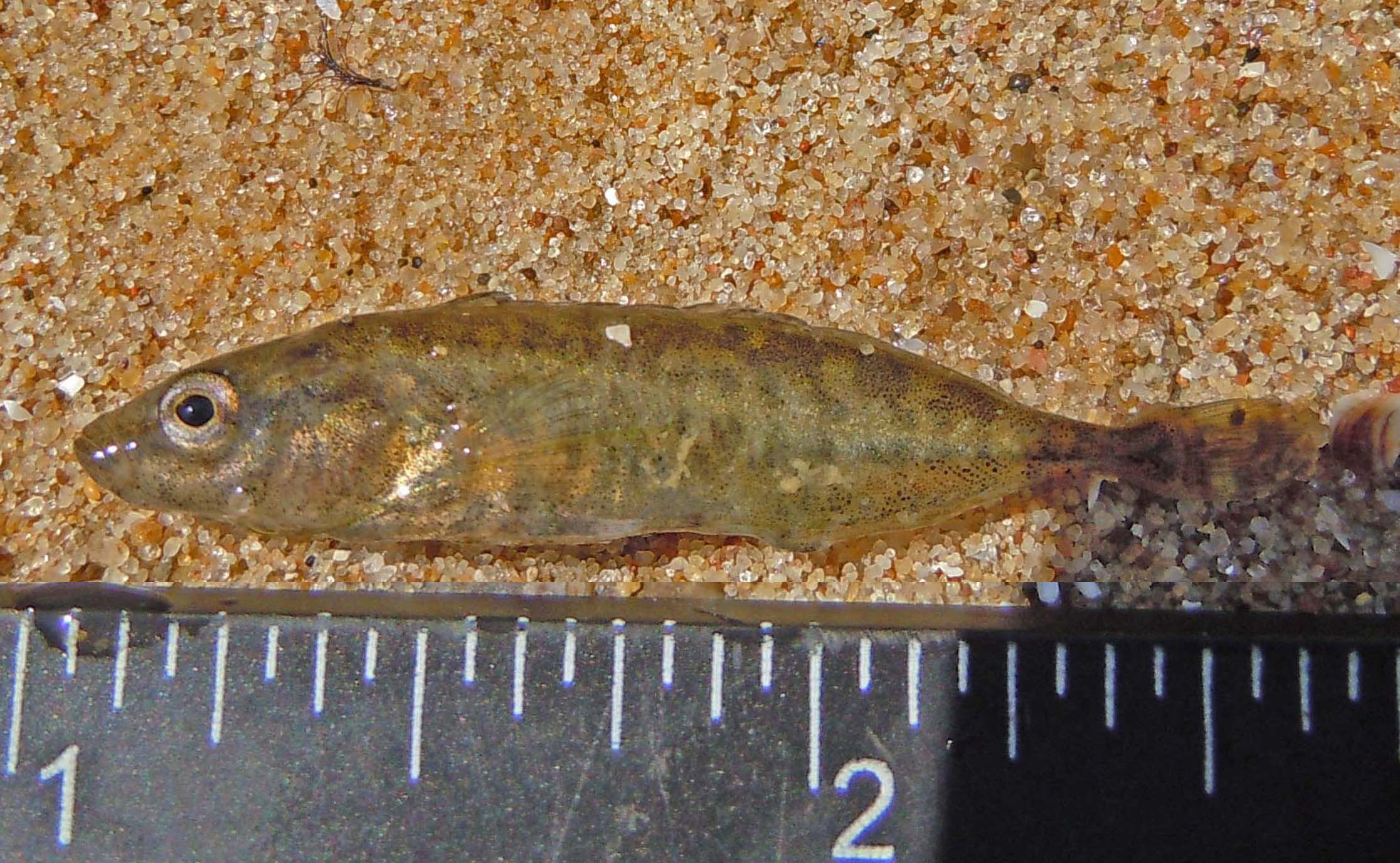
The Ukrainian stickleback (Pungitius platygaster) was the only native species of the Aral Sea to survive its reduction and salinization.

=== Native fish ===
Despite its former vast size, the Aral Sea had relatively low indigenous biodiversity. However, the Aral Sea basin had an exceptional array of endemic fish subspecies (including three endemic sturgeon species). Most of these still survive in the North Aral Sea, but some, such as the sturgeons, have been greatly reduced or even driven to extirpation by the lake's shrinkage. Native fish species of the lake included

- ship sturgeon (Acipenser nudiventris)
- all three Pseudoscaphirhynchus sturgeon species
- Aral trout (Salmo trutta aralensis)
- northern pike (Esox lucius)
- ide (Leuciscus idus oxianus)
- asp (Aspius aspius iblioides)
- common rudd (Scardinius erythropthalmus)
- Turkestan barbel (Luciobarbus capito conocephalus)
- Aral barbel (L. brachycephalus brachycephalus)
- common bream (Abramis brama orientalis)
- white-eyed bream (Ballerus sapa aralensis)
- Danube bleak (Chalcalburnus chalcoides aralensis)
- ziege (Pelecus cultratus)
- crucian carp (Carassius carassius gibelio)
- common carp (Cyprinus carpio aralensis)
- Wels catfish (Silurus glanis)
- Ukrainian stickleback (Pungitius platygaster aralensis)
- zander (Sander lucioperca)
- European perch (Perca fluviatilis)
- Eurasian ruffe (Gymnocephalus cernuus)

All these fish aside from the stickleback lived an anadromous or semi-anadromous lifestyle.

The salinity increase and drying of the lake led to the local extinction of the Aral trout, ruffe, Turkestan barbel, and all sturgeon species, and dams now block their return and migration routes; the Aral trout and Syr Darya sturgeon (Pseudoscaphirhynchus fedtschenkoi) may be extinct due to their restricted range. All other native fish, barring the stickleback (which persisted during the lake's shrinkage and salinity increase), were also extirpated, but many have returned to the North Aral Sea following its recovery from the 1990s onwards.

=== Introduced fish ===
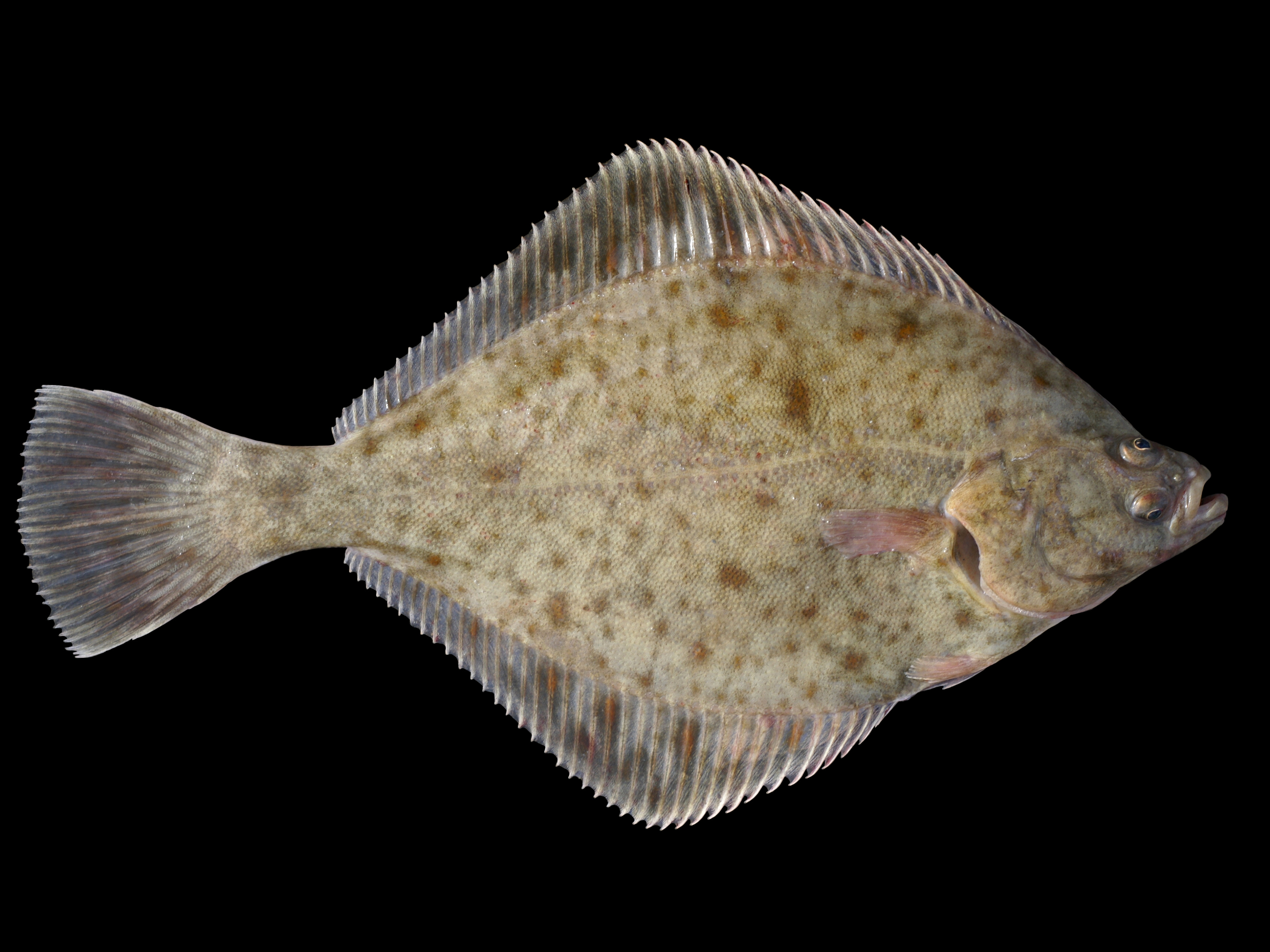
The European flounder (Platichthys flesus) was a saltwater fish introduced to the Aral Sea.

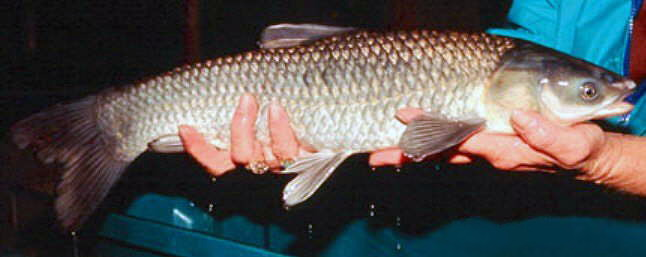
The black carp (Mylopharyngodon piceus) was a freshwater fish introduced to the Aral Sea.

Other salt-tolerant fish species were intentionally or inadvertently introduced during the 1960s when hydropower and irrigation projects reduced the flow of fresh water thereby increasing salinity. These include the Baltic herring (Clupea harengus membras), big-scale sand smelt (Atherina boyeri caspia), black-striped pipefish (Syngnatus abaster caspius), Caucasian dwarf goby (Knipowitschia caucasica), monkey goby (Neogobius fluviatilis), round goby (N. melanostomus), Syrman goby (N. syrman), bighead goby (Ponticola kessleri), tubenose goby (Proterorchinus marmoratus), grass carp (Ctenopharyngodon idella), silver carp (Hypophtalmichthys molitrix), bighead carp (H. nobilis), black carp (Mylopharyngodon piceus), and northern snakehead (Channa argus warpachowski).

The herring, sand smelt, and gobies were the first planktivorous fish in the lake, leading to a collapse of the lake's zooplankton population. This in turn caused a collapse of the herring and sand smelt population from which neither species has recovered. All introduced species aside from the carp, snakehead, and (possibly) pipefish survived the lake's shrinkage and salinity increase, and during this time the European flounder (Platichthys flesus) was introduced to revive fisheries. The extirpated species (aside from possibly the pipefish) returned to the North Aral Sea following its recovery. Herring, sand smelt, gobies and flounder persisted in the South Aral Sea until increasing salinity extirpated all but the gobies.

=== Invertebrates ===
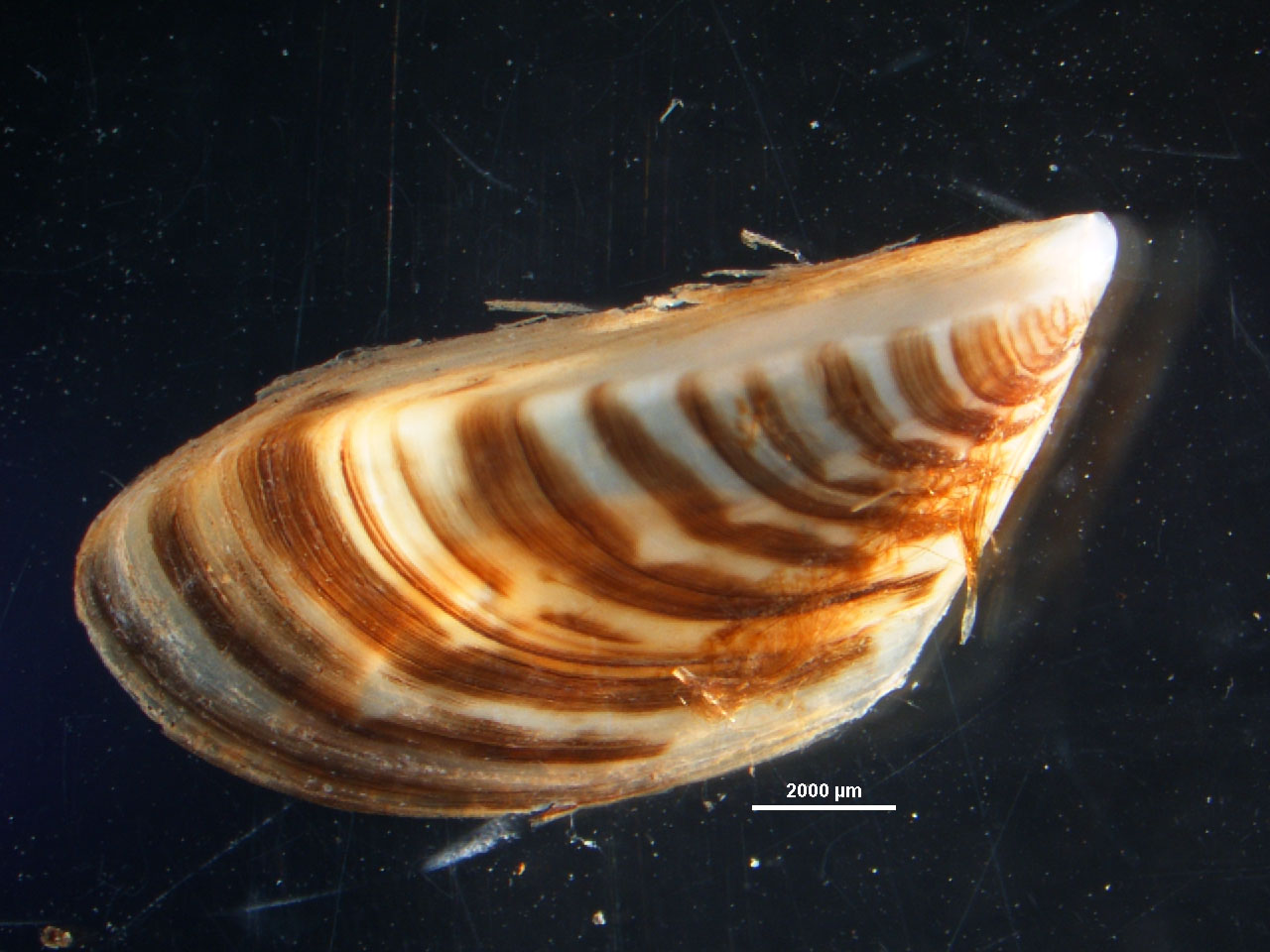
Zebra mussel (Dreissena polymorpha), a former dominant member of the sea's benthic fauna that has since returned to the North Aral Sea.

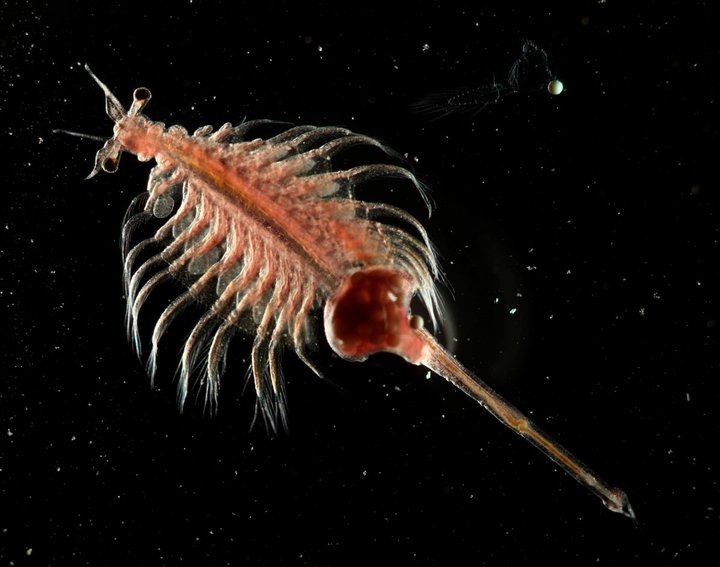
Parthenogenic brine shrimp (Artemia parthenogenetica), the dominant crustacean of the South Aral Sea and its fragments.

Prior to its shrinkage, the Aral Sea had about 250 species of native aquatic invertebrates, the majority (about 80%) being freshwater species; the rest were marine invertebrates with ties to the Ponto-Caspian and Mediterranean-Atlantic fauna. The dominant species (excluding protozoa) were rotifers, cladocerans, and copepods. Advanced crustaceans (Malacostraca) were represented by a single amphipod species, Dikerogammarus aralensis, an endemic of the Syr Darya basin. There were several native bivalves in the Aral Sea, including members of the genera Dreissena (including an endemic subspecies of zebra mussel, Dreissena polymorpha aralensis), Hypanis, and the lagoon cockle (Cerastoderma glaucum) (formerly considered distinct species Cerastoderma rhomboides and C. isthmica). Native gastropods included Theodoxus pallasi and a member of Caspiohydrobia.

Many of these invertebrates had their numbers drastically reduced due to the introduced fish species. Later, during an unsuccessful attempt to introduce mullet (Mugil sp.) to the Aral from the Caspian Sea, the rockpool shrimp (Palaemon elegans) was inadvertently introduced to the sea. The shrimp is thought to be responsible for the extirpation of the near-endemic amphipod Dikerogammarus aralensis, which now survives only in the Syr Darya basin. The copepod Calanipeda aquaedulcis was introduced to the Aral to replace the zooplankton species reduced by the herring population, and the North American mud crab Rhithropanopeus harrisii was inadvertently introduced during this attempt as well.

Later, as the lake's salinity increased, many of the freshwater-adapted species disappeared, only leaving behind the marine and saline species. However, the zooplankton population in the North Aral Sea has recovered as salinity has decreased from the 1990s onwards, with extirpated crustacean and rotifer species returning naturally via the Syr Darya River, at the expense of the saltwater species. The cladoceran Moina mongolica, extirpated by the introduced fish species, has also returned. The zebra mussel (Dreissena polymorpha aralensis) has been reintroduced. In contrast, in the South Aral Sea only a few nematodes, rotifers, and parthenogenic brine shrimp (Artemia parthenogenetica) exist. The future prospects for aquatic invertebrates in all remaining Aral Sea fragments depend on their future changes in salinity.

== History ==
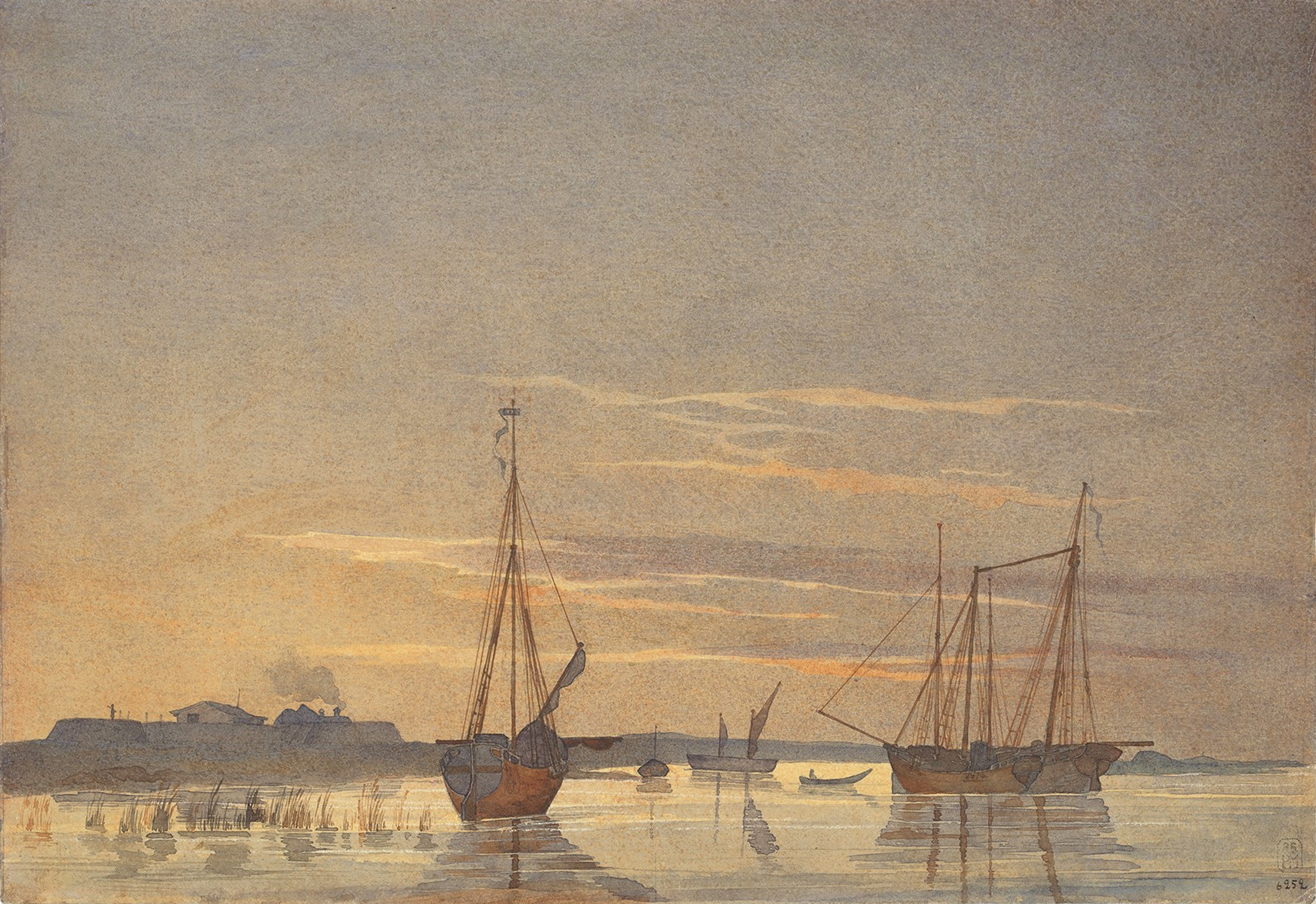
First Russian boats on the Aral Sea, watercolor by Taras Shevchenko, 1848

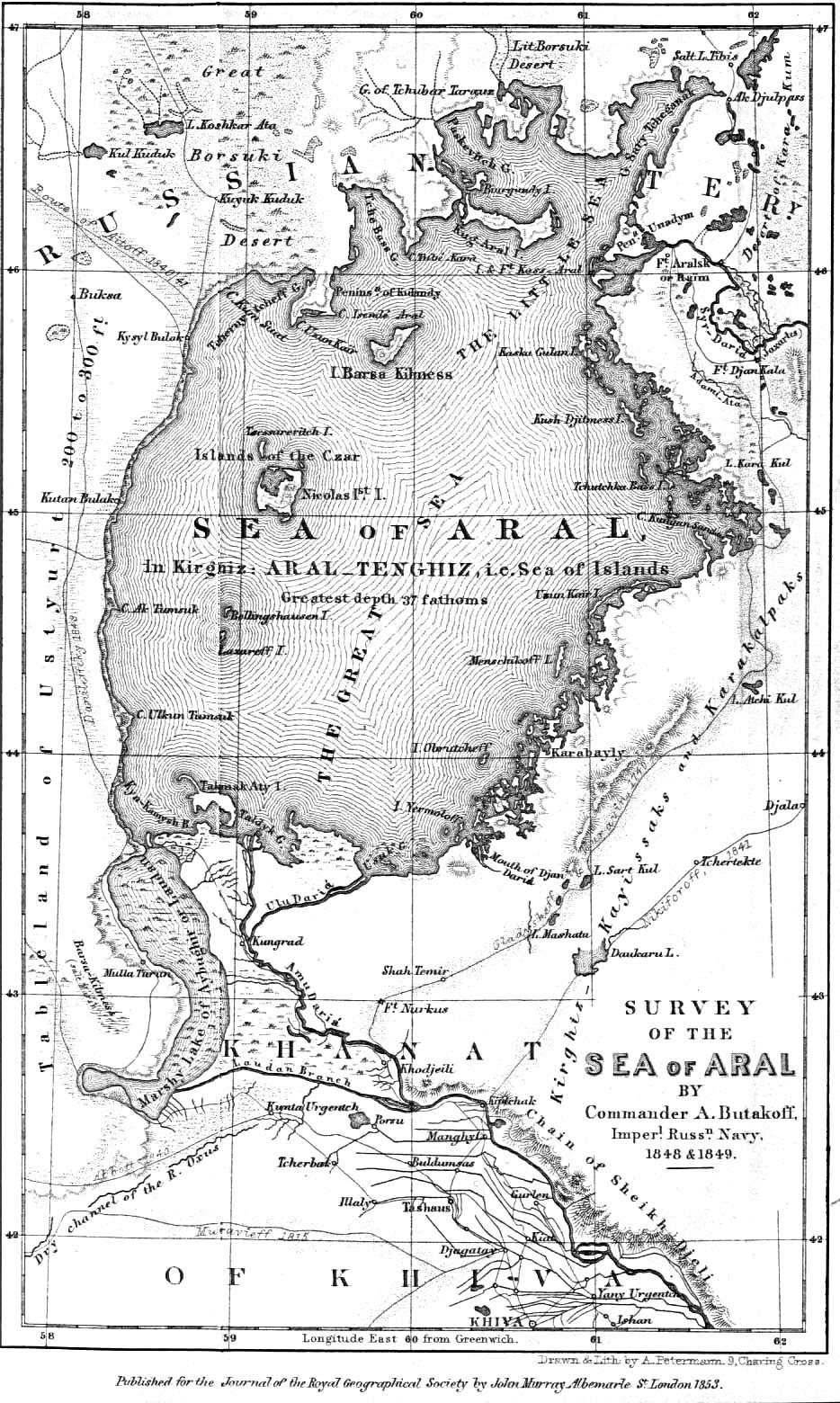
1853 map of the Aral Sea

Climate shifts have driven multiple phases of sea-level rise and fall. Inflow rates from the Amu Darya and Syr Darya are affected by glacial melt rates at the rivers' headwaters as well as precipitation within the river basins; cold, dry climates restrict both processes. Geologically driven shifts in the course of the Amu Darya between the Aral Sea and the Sarykamysh basins and anthropogenic water withdrawal from Amu Darya and Syr Darya have caused fluctuations in the Aral Sea's water level. Artificial irrigation systems began in ancient times and continue to the present. According to Sergey Tolstov's theory, once Amu Darya was connected to Caspian sea, but this connection was broken by people 2500 years ago to feed the Aral Sea and irrigation system in Khorezm, more precisely in Khiva and other cities in this region.

The Aral Sea was part of the western frontier of the Chinese Empire, around 660-665, during the Tang dynasty.

During Mongol Invasion, Mongols destroyed the cities and waterworks, which led to changes in Amu Darya's route, or some of its branches, and refilling the Lake Sarykamysh, that connected Caspian Sea again. Aral Sea region was divided between three Mongol Hordes: the Jochi or Golden Horde, the Ilkhanids, and the Chagatai.

Muslim geographers, such as Hafiz-i Abru, wrote about the disappearance of the Aral Sea in 1417 due to diversions in both the Amu Darya and Syr Darya. The Syr Darya only resumed its natural course into the lake after 1573, when the channels that had been carved to divert its course to the south fell into disrepair. That caused the surface of the sea to steadily rise, flooding the basin for the next four centuries.

The Russian expedition of Alexey Butakov performed the first observations of the Aral Sea in 1848. The first steamer arrived in the Aral Sea three years later. The Aral Sea fishing industry began with the Russian dealers Lapshin, Ritkin, Krasilnikov, and Makeev, which later formed major fishing unions.

=== Naval ===
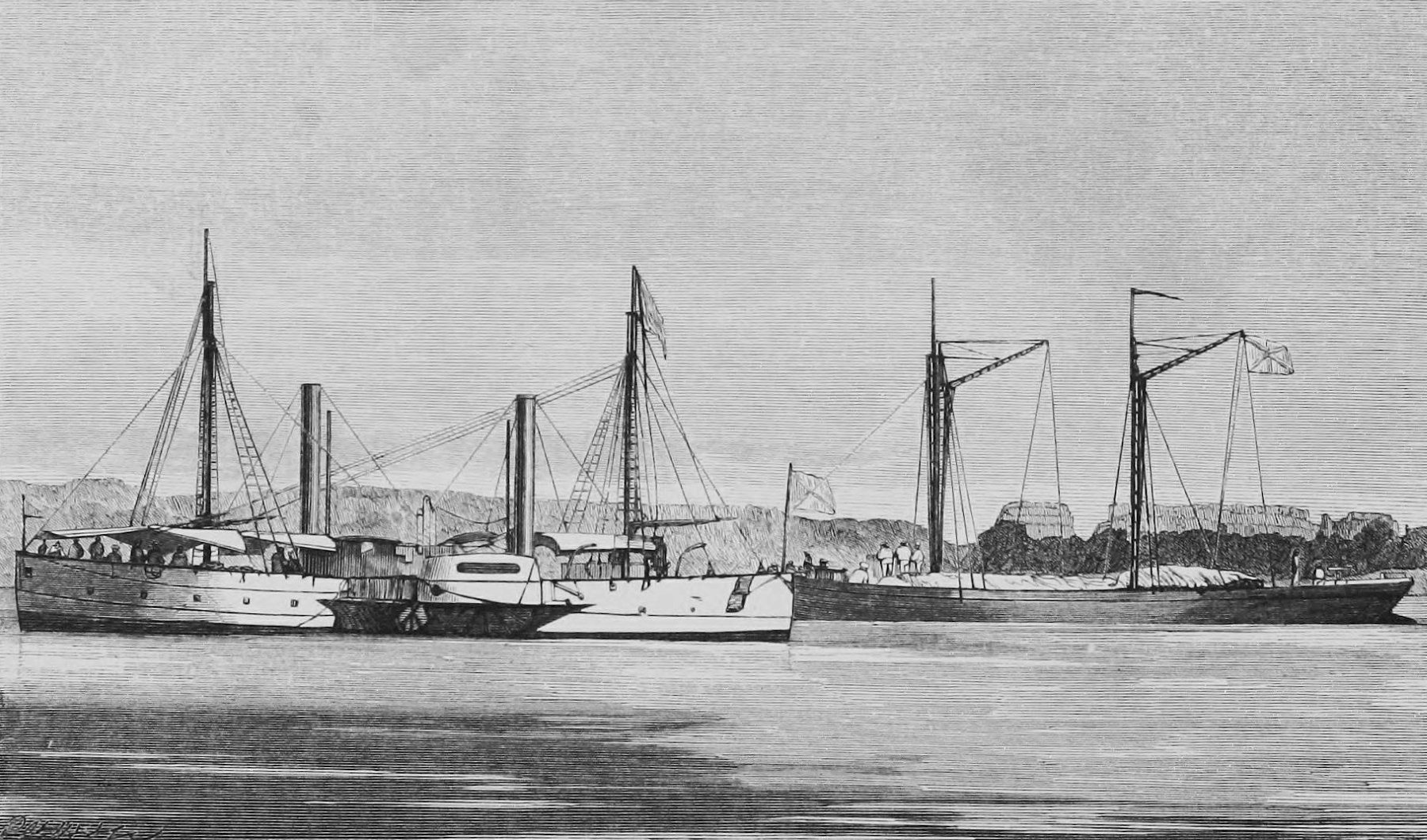
Ships of Imperial Russian Navy's Aral Flotilla in the 1850s

Russian naval presence on the Aral Sea began in 1847 with the founding of Raimsk, soon renamed Fort Aralsk, near the mouth of the Syr Darya. As the Aral Sea basin is not connected to other bodies of water, the Imperial Russian Navy deployed its vessels by disassembling them in Orenburg on the Ural River and transporting them overland to be reassembled at Aralsk. The first two ships, assembled in 1847, were the two-masted schooners Nikolai and Mikhail. The former was a warship; the latter a merchant vessel to establish fisheries. They surveyed the northern part of the sea in 1848, the same year that a larger warship, the Constantine, was assembled. Commanded by Lt. Alexey Butakov (Алексей Бутаков), the Constantine completed the survey of the entire Aral Sea over the next two years. Exiled Ukrainian poet and painter Taras Shevchenko participated in the expedition and produced a number of sketches.

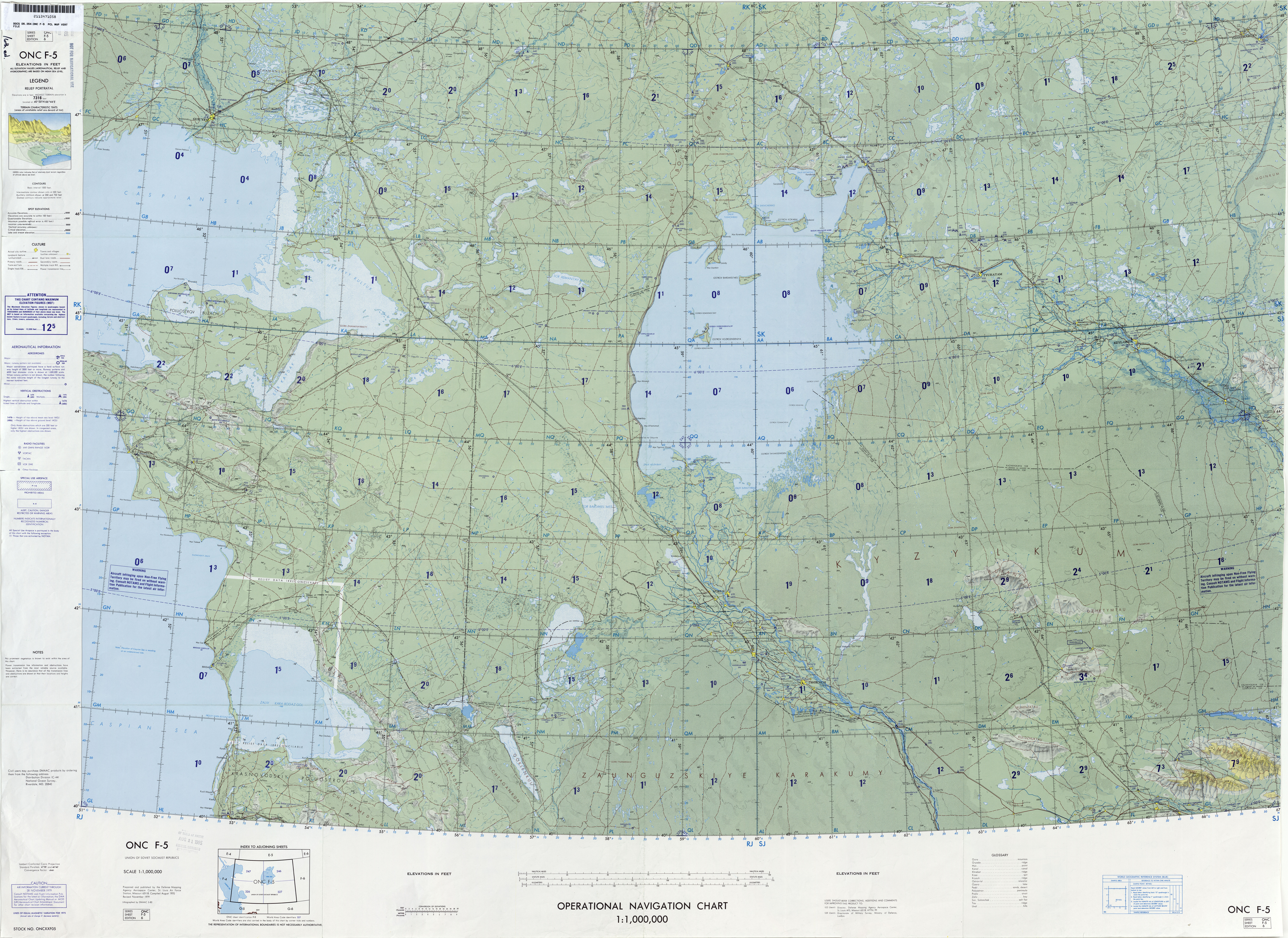
Map including the Aral Sea and surrounding region (DMA, 1979)

In 1851 two newly built steamers arrived from Sweden. The geological surveys had found no coal deposits in the area so the Military Governor-General of Orenburg Vasily Perovsky ordered an "as large as possible supply" of saxaul (Haloxylon ammodendron) to be collected in Aralsk for the new steamers. Saxaul wood proved not to be a suitable fuel and in the later years the Aral Flotilla was provisioned, at substantial cost, by coal from the Donbas.

=== Irrigation canals ===
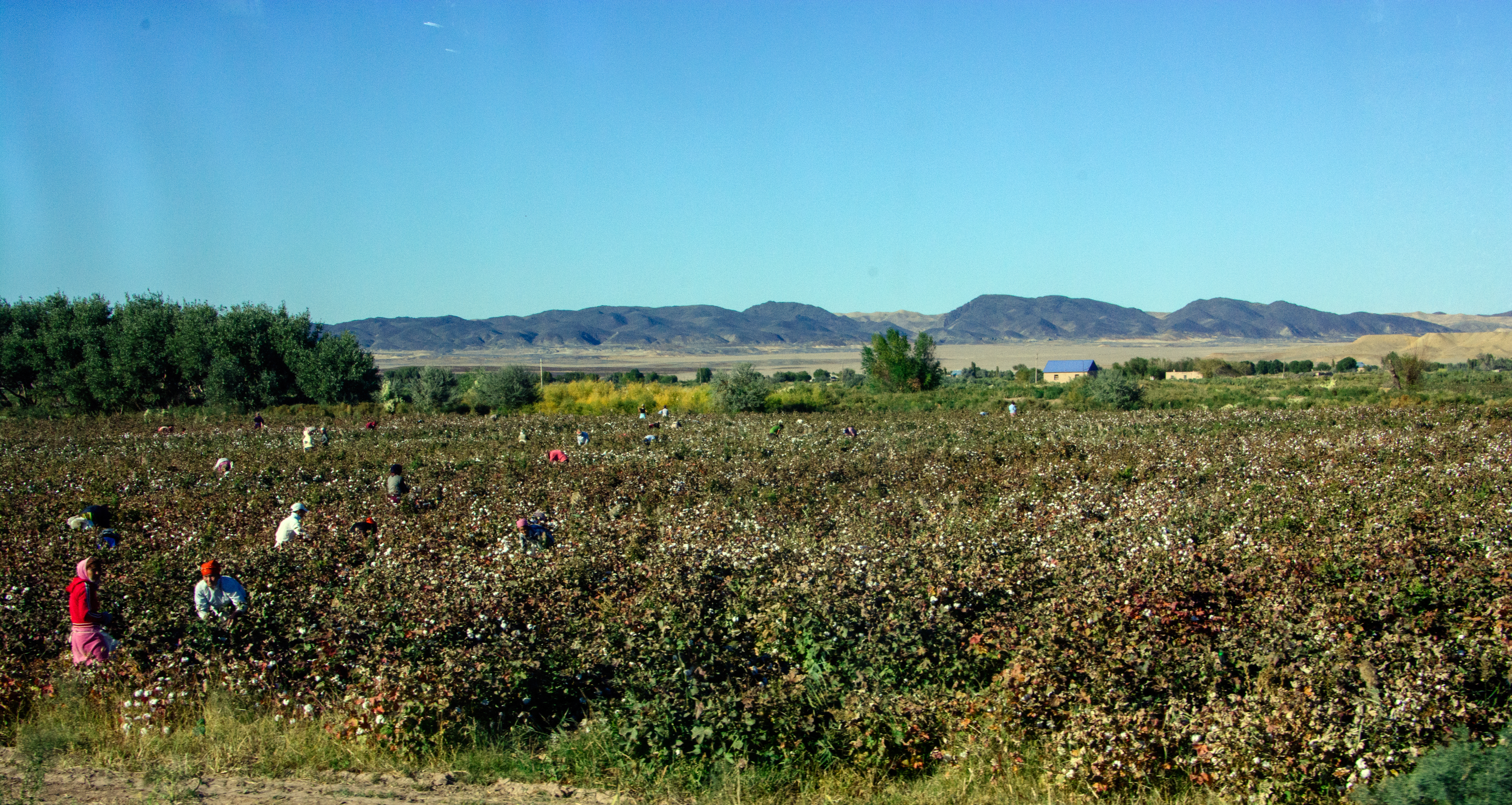
Cotton picking near Kyzyl-Kala, Karakalpakstan

Timeline of shrinking

Satellite images show the changing water levels in the Aral Sea from 2000 to 2018.

In the early 1960s, as part of the Soviet government plan for cotton, or "white gold", to become a major export, the Amu Darya river in the south and the Syr Darya river in the east were diverted from feeding the Aral Sea to irrigate the desert in an attempt to grow cotton, melons, rice and cereals. This plan was initially successful, and by 1988, Uzbekistan was the world's largest exporter of cotton. However to achieve these results farms relied heavily on agro-chemicals, including dioxins, which were used even after being banned. Farmers, including children, were negatively affected by these chemicals. Due to abuse, the soil crucially degraded. Though production levels declined from its peak, cotton remains Uzbekistan's main cash crop, accounting for 17% of the country's exports in 2006.

Large scale construction of irrigation canals first began in the 1930s and was greatly increased in the 1960s. Many canals were poorly built, allowing leakage and evaporation. Between 30 and 75% of the water from the Qaraqum Canal, the largest in Central Asia, went to waste. It was estimated in 2012 that only 12% of Uzbekistan's irrigation canal length was waterproofed. Only 28% of interfarm irrigation channels, and 21% of onfarm channels have anti-infiltration linings, which retain on average 15% more water than unlined channels. Only 77% of farm intakes have flow gauges.

By 1960, between 20 and 60 km^{3} (4.8 and 14.4 cu mi) of water each year was going to the land instead of the Aral Sea and the sea began to recede. From 1961 to 1970, the Aral's level fell an average of 20 cm (7.9 in) per year. In the 1970s the rate nearly tripled to 50–60 cm (20–24 in) per annum, and in the 1980s to 80–90 cm (31–35 in) per annum. The amount of water taken for irrigation from the rivers doubled between 1960 and 2000. In the first half of the 20th century prior to the irrigation, the sea's water level above sea level held steady at 53 m. By 2010, the large Aral was 27 m and the small Aral 43 m above sea level.

The disappearance of the lake was no surprise to the Soviets; they expected it to happen long before. As early as 1964, Aleksandr Asarin at the Hydroproject Institute pointed out that the lake was doomed, explaining, "It was part of the five-year plans, approved by the council of ministers and the Politburo. Nobody on a lower level would dare to say a word contradicting those plans, even if it was the fate of the Aral Sea."

The reaction to the predictions varied. Some Soviet experts apparently considered the Aral to be "nature's error", and a Soviet engineer said in 1968, "it is obvious to everyone that the evaporation of the Aral Sea is inevitable." On the other hand, starting in the 1960s, a large-scale project was proposed to redirect part of the flow of the rivers of the Ob basin to Central Asia over a gigantic canal system. Refilling of the Aral Sea was considered one of the project's main goals. However, due to its staggering costs and the negative public opinion in Russia proper, the federal authorities had abandoned the project by 1986.

From 1960 to 1998, the sea's surface area shrank by 60%, and its volume by 80%. In 1960, the Aral Sea had been the world's fourth-largest lake with an area of 68,000 km^{2} (26,000 sq mi) and a volume of 1,100 km^{3} (260 cu mi). By 1998, it had dropped to 28,687 km^{2} (11,076 sq mi) and eighth largest. Its salinity increased; having originally been 10 g/L, by 1990 it was approximately 30 g/L. (By comparison, seawater is typically 35 g/L.)

In 1987, the lake split into two separate bodies of water: the North Aral Sea (the Lesser Sea, or Small Aral Sea) and the South Aral Sea (the Greater Sea, or Large Aral Sea). In June 1991, Uzbekistan gained independence from the Soviet Union. Craig Murray, UK ambassador to Uzbekistan in 2002, attributes the shrinkage of the Aral Sea in the 1990s to president Islam Karimov's cotton policy. The enormous irrigation system was massively wasteful, crop rotation was not used, and huge quantities of pesticides and fertilizer were applied. The runoff from the fields washed these chemicals into the shrinking sea, creating severe pollution and health problems. As demand for cotton increased, the government applied more pesticides and fertilizer to the monocultured and depleted soil. Forced labor was used and profits were siphoned off by the powerful and well-connected.

In 2003, the South Aral further divided into eastern and western basins. The waters in the deepest parts of the sea were saltier and didn't mix with the top waters, so only the top of the sea was heated in the summer, resulting in faster evaporation than had been predicted. A plan was announced for the recovery of the North Aral Sea by building Dike Kokaral, a concrete dam separating the two halves of the Aral Sea.

In 2004, the sea's surface area was 17,160 km^{2} (6,630 sq mi), 25% of its original size, and a nearly fivefold increase in salinity had killed most of its flora and fauna. Dike Kokaral was completed in 2005 and, as of 2006, some recovery of sea level had been recorded.

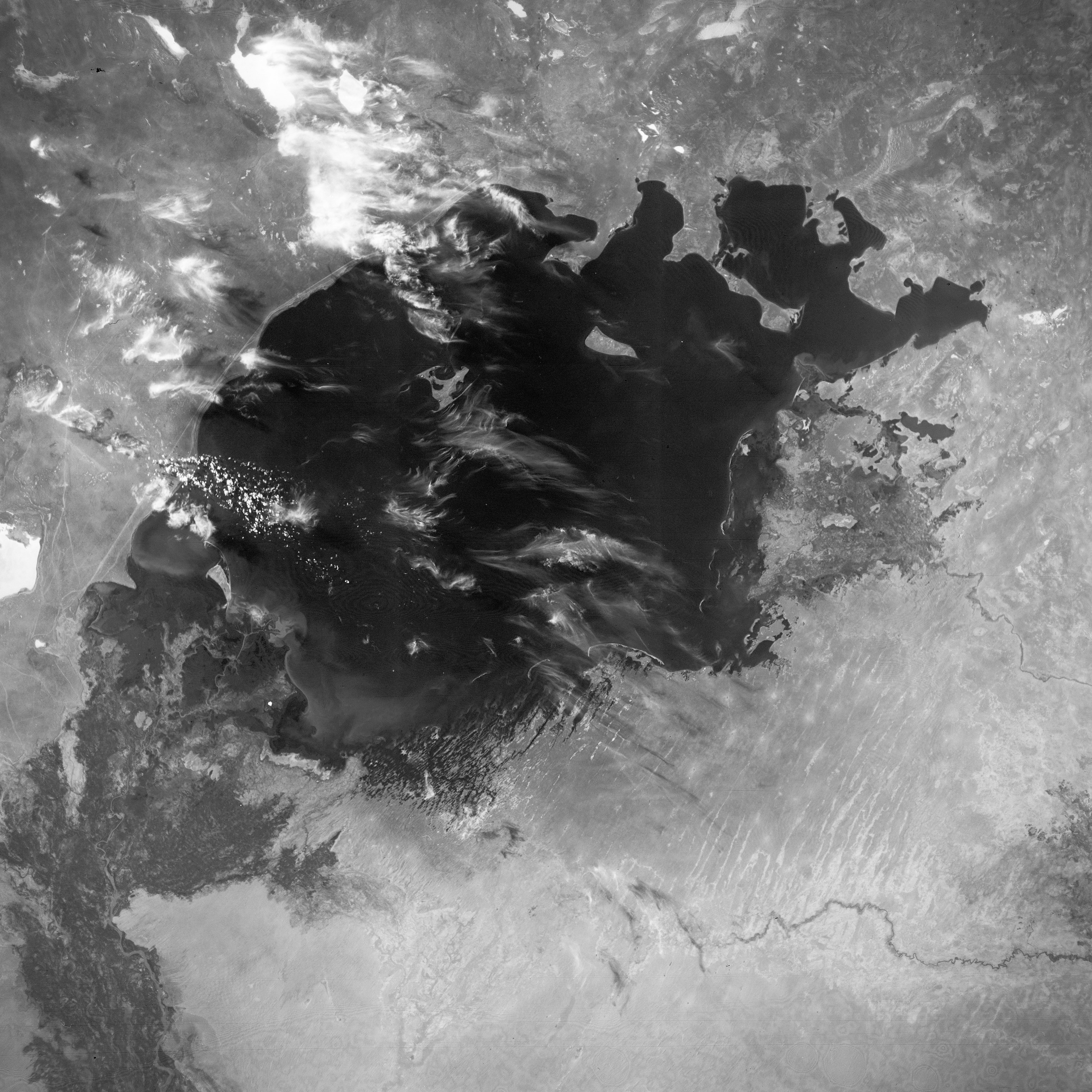
Aral Sea from space (northwest at top), August 22, 1964

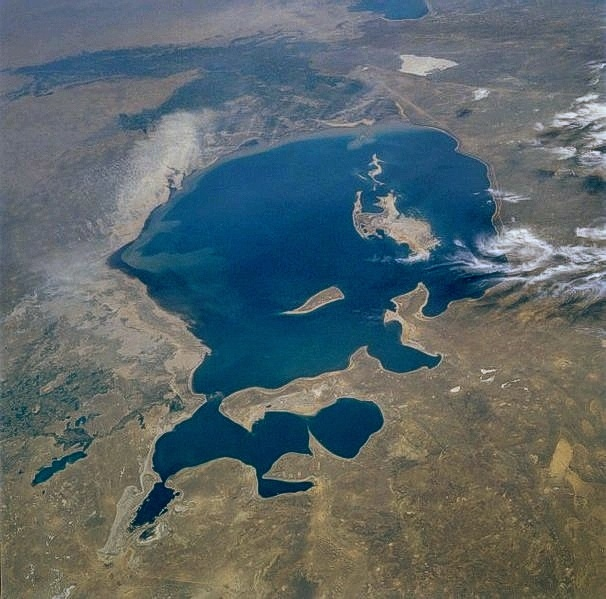
Aral Sea from space (north at bottom), August 1985

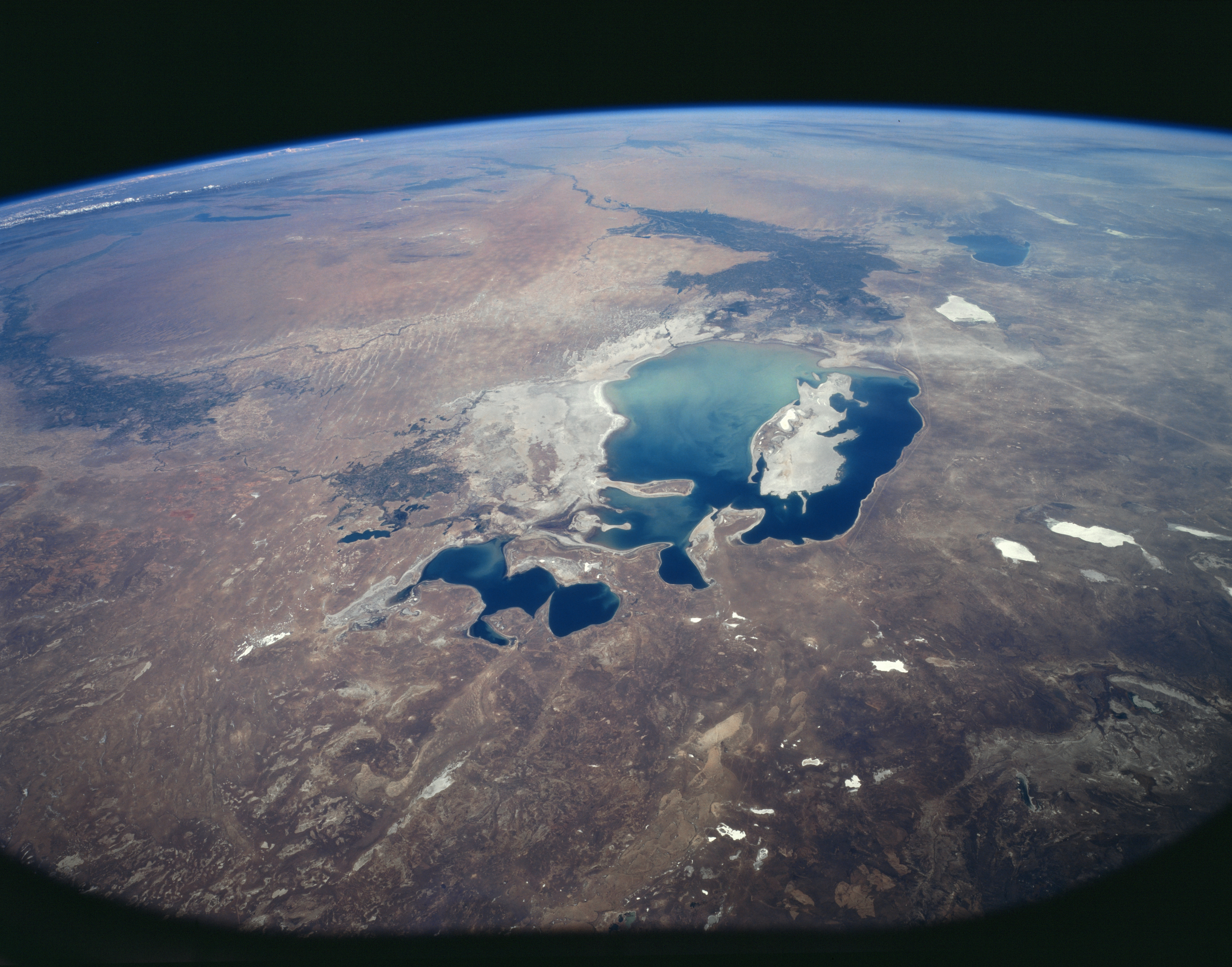
Aral Sea from space (north at bottom), August 1997

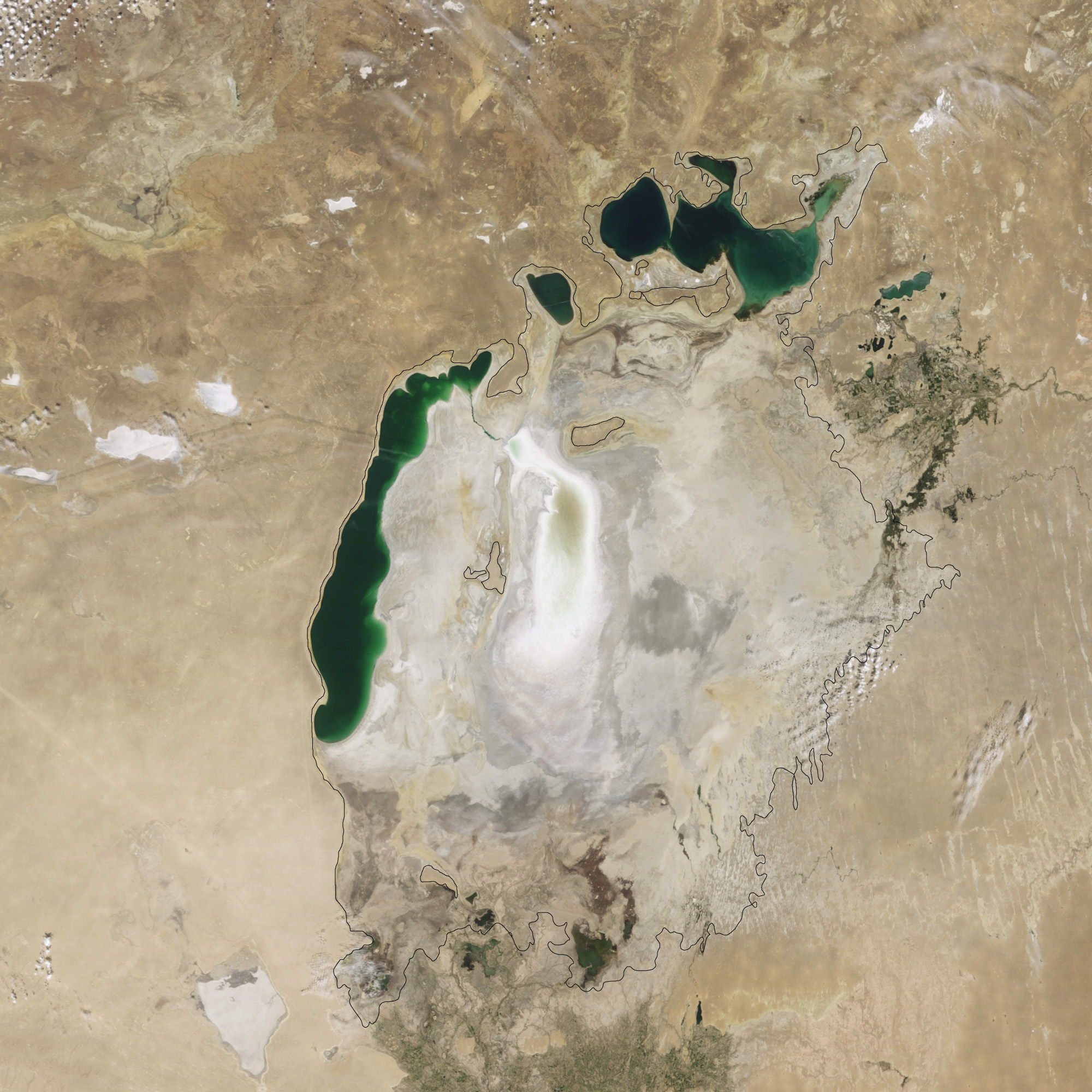
Aral Sea from space (north at top), August 2009

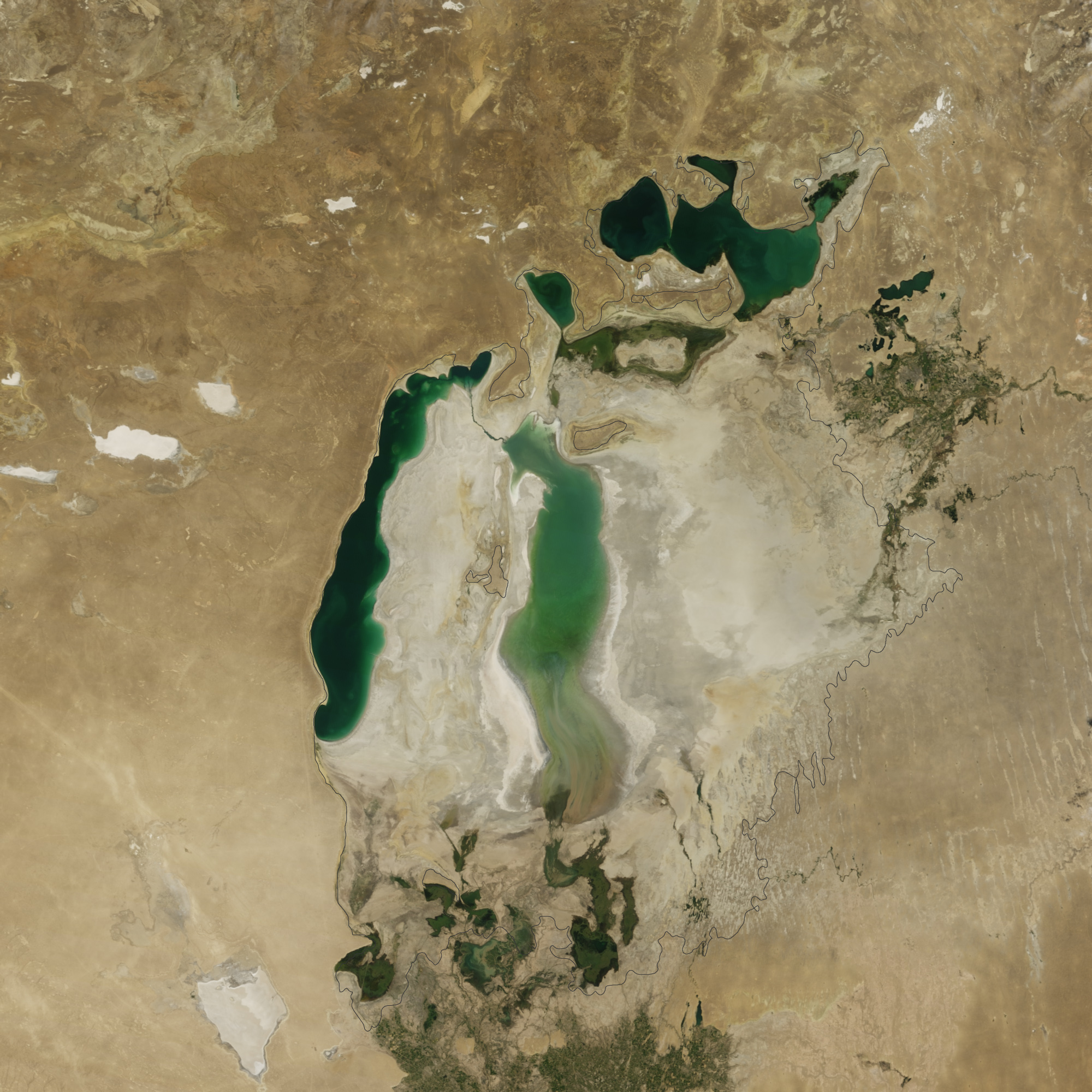
Aral Sea in August 2010, with part of the eastern basin reflooded from heavy snowmelt.

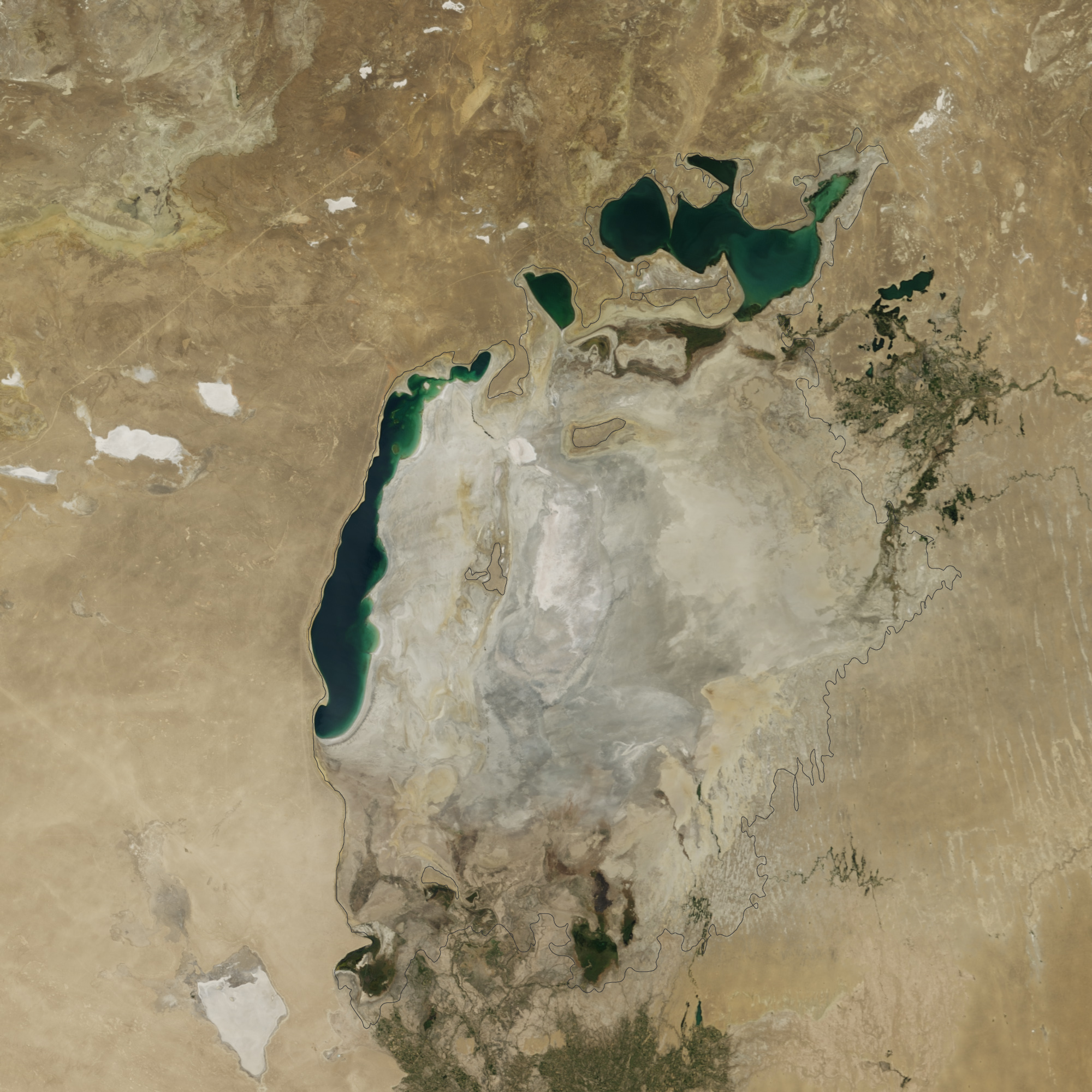
Aral Sea completely loses its eastern lobe in August 2014

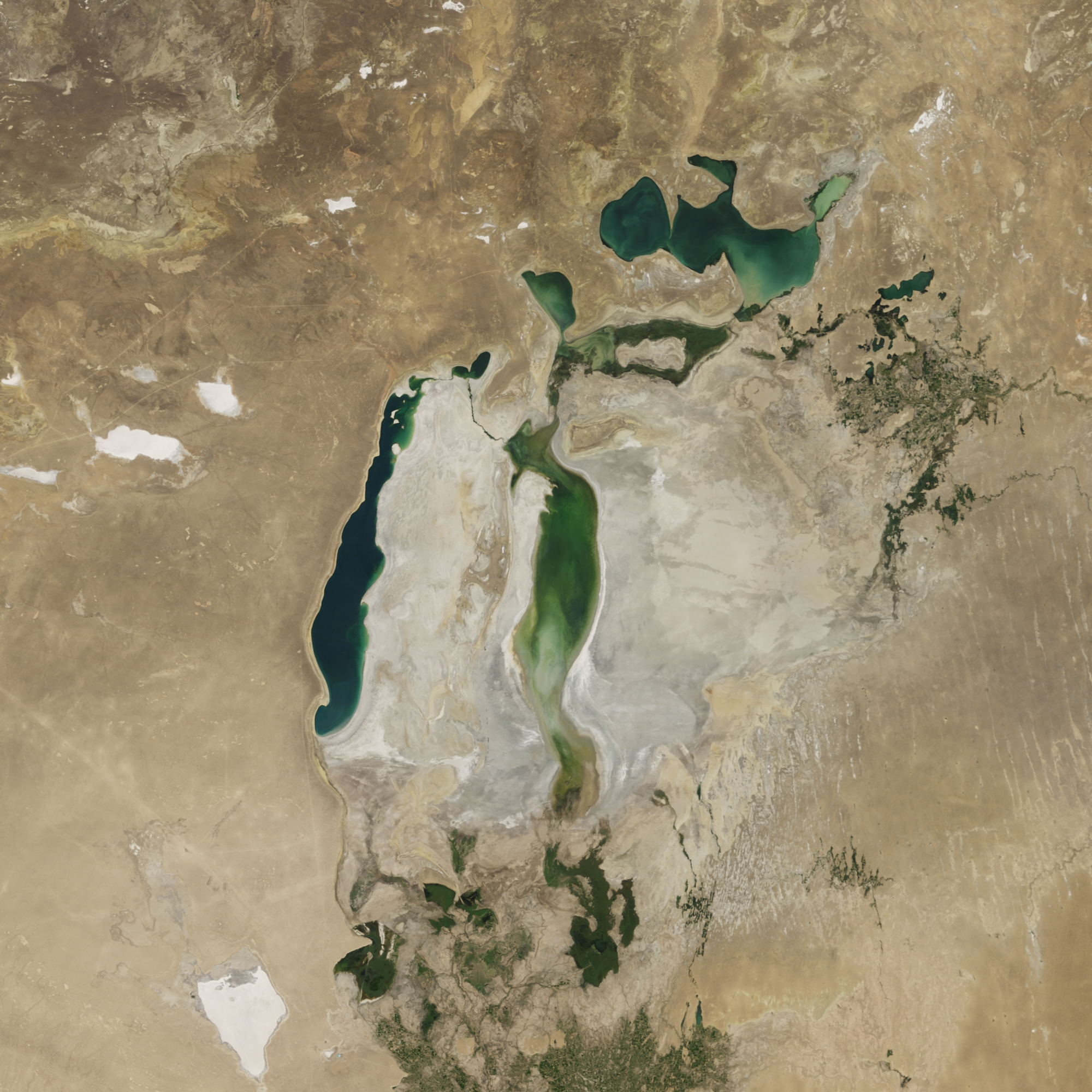
Aral Sea from space, August 2017. Part of the eastern basin was reflooded from heavy snowmelt in 2015.

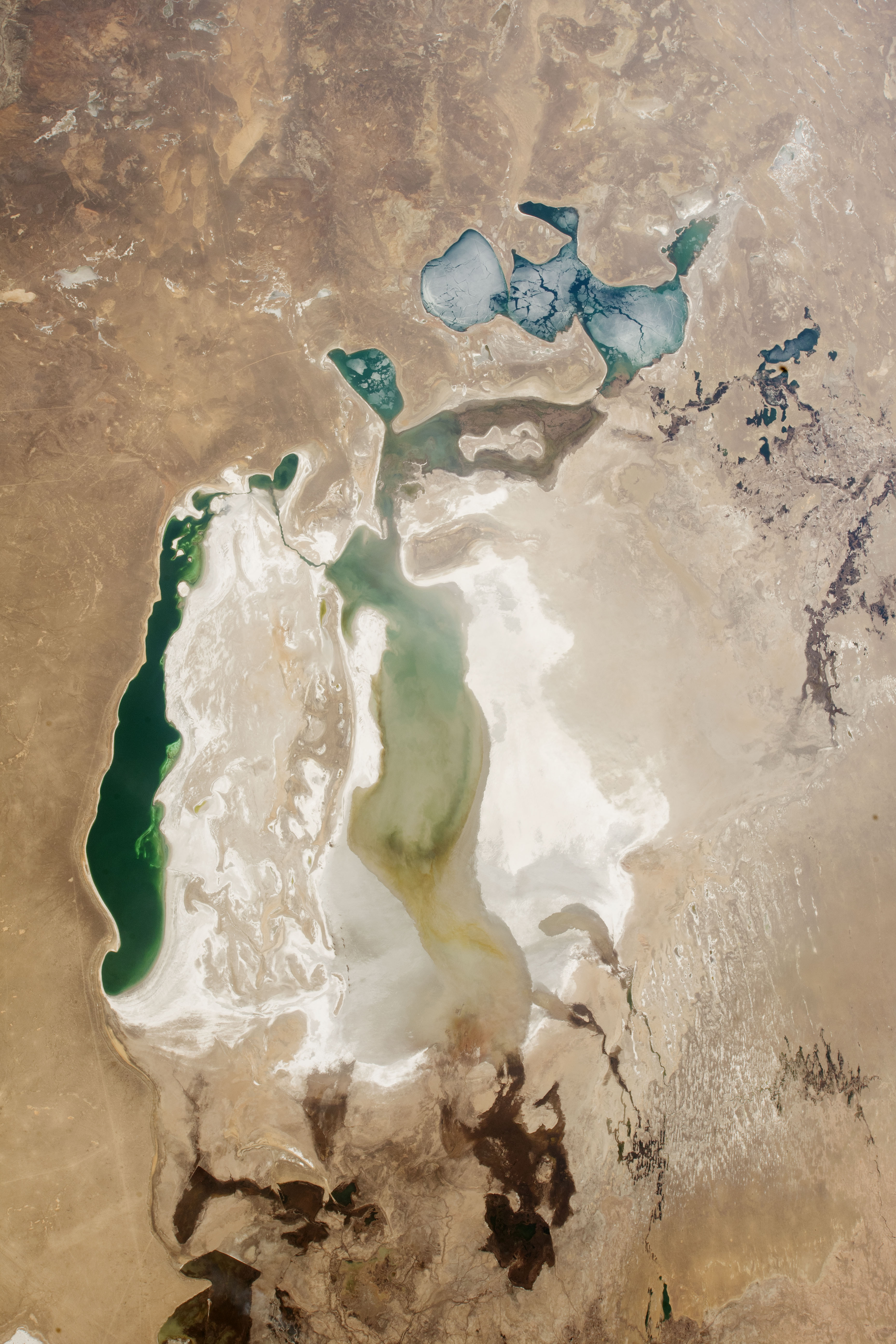
April 2018

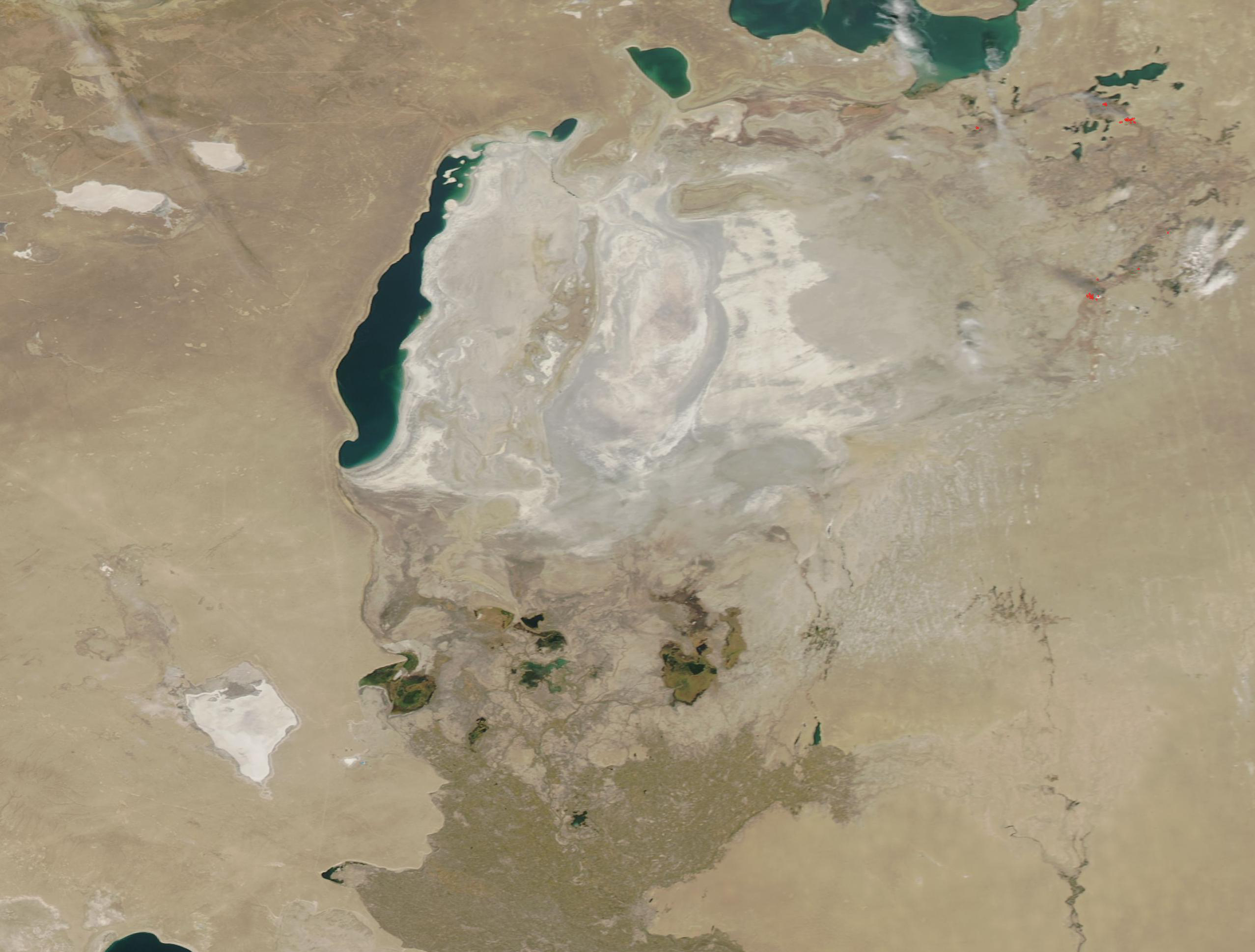
Aral Sea once again completely loses its eastern lobe in October 2019

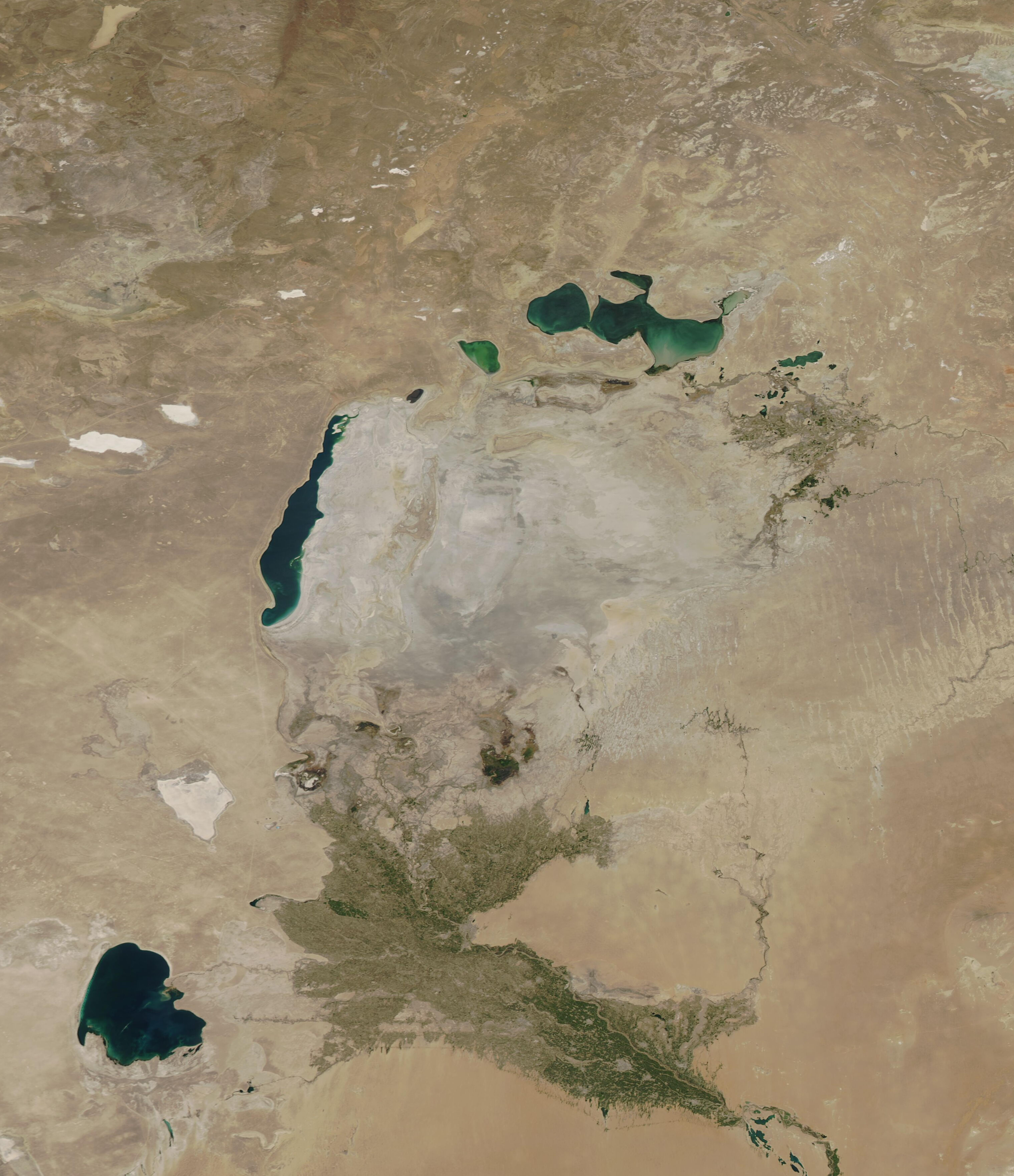
August 2021

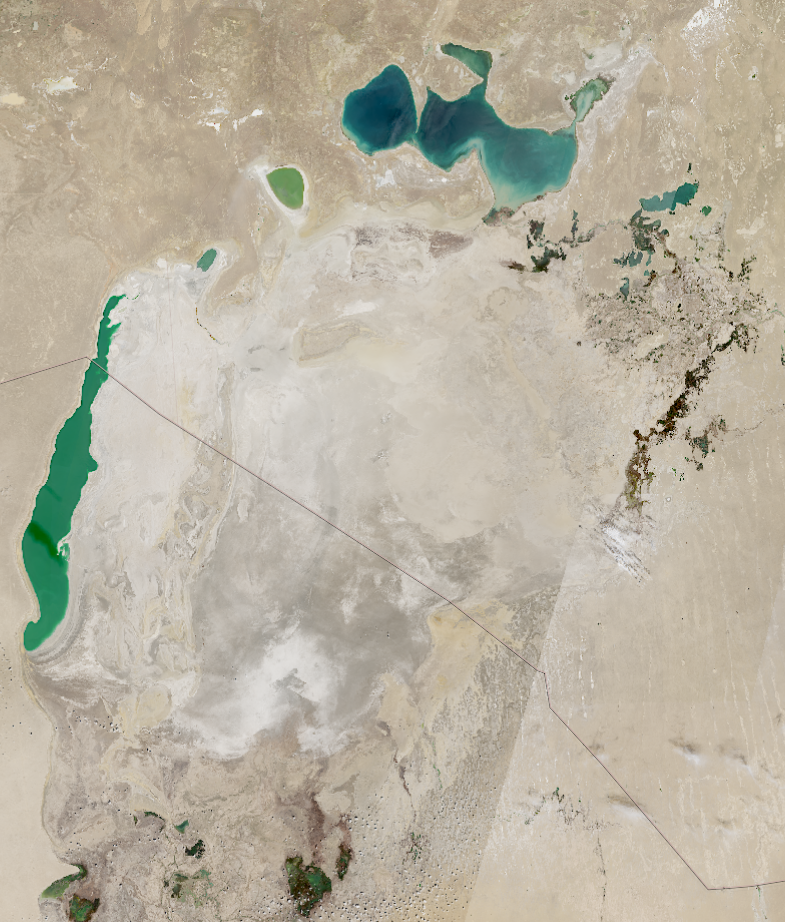
Further area reductions in western lakes, as captured in May 2024

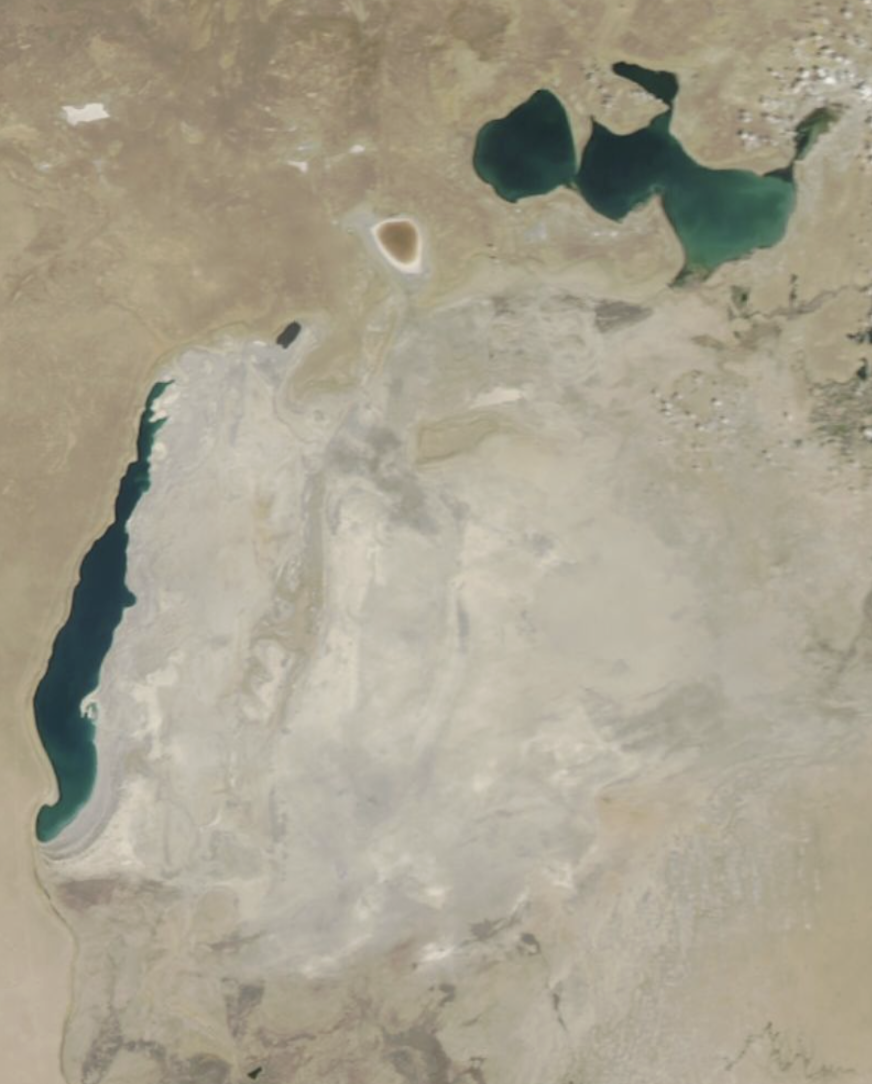
August 2024

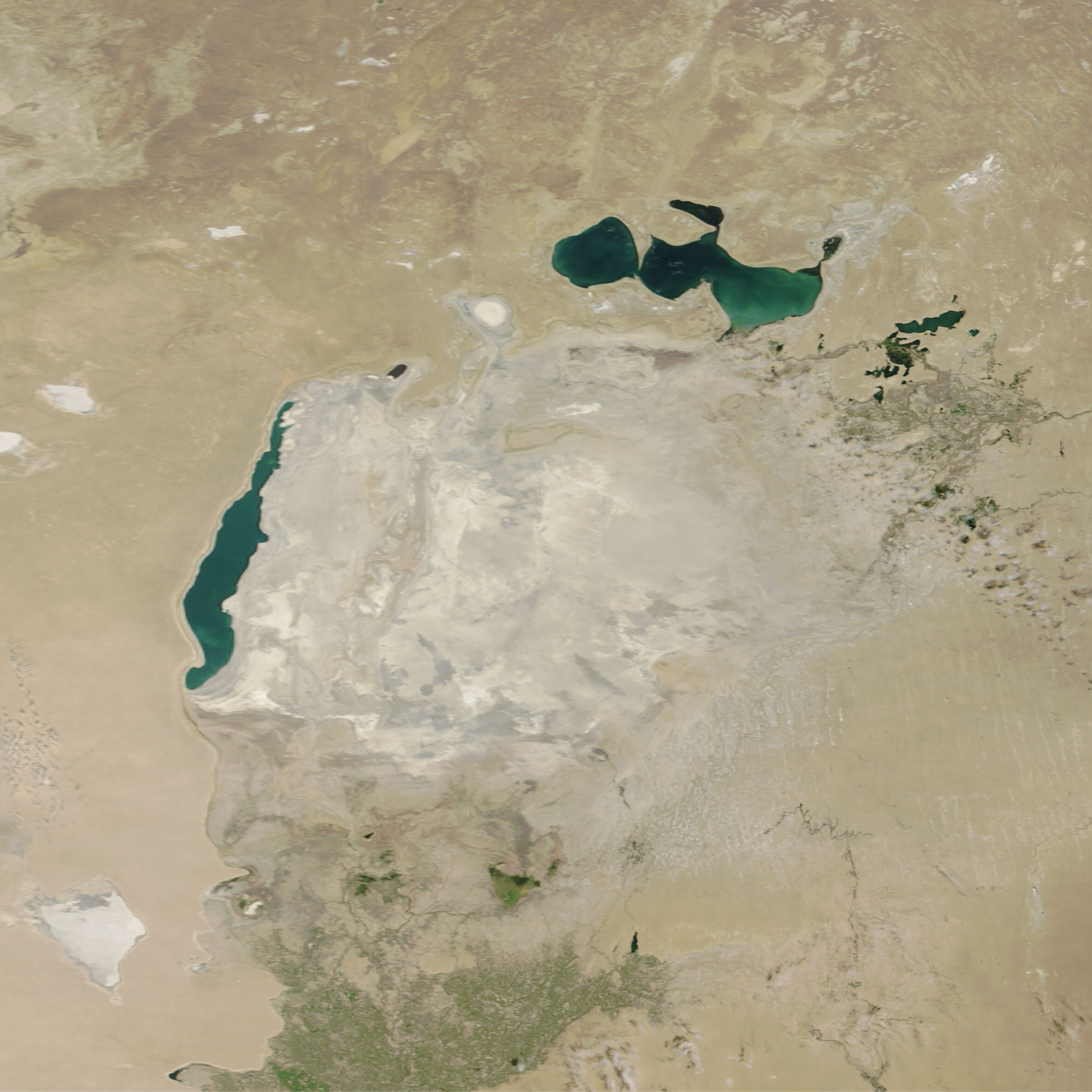
August 25, 2026

== Impact on environment, economy, and public health ==
The Aral Sea is considered an example of ecosystem collapse. The ecosystems of the Aral Sea and the river deltas feeding into it have been nearly destroyed, largely because of the salinity being dramatically higher than ocean water. The receding sea has left huge plains covered with salt and toxic chemicals from weapons testing, industrial projects, and runoff of pesticides and fertilizer. Because of the shrinking water source and worsening water and soil quality, pesticides were increasingly used from the 1960s to raise cotton yield, which further polluted the water with toxins (e.g. HCH, TCCD, DDT). Industrial pollution also resulted in PCB and heavy-metal contamination.

Owing to the insufficiency of water left in the Aral Sea, concentrations of these pollutants rose drastically both in the remaining water and in the dry beds. This resulted in wind-borne toxic dust that spread quite widely. People living in the lower parts of the river basins and former shore zones ingested pollutants through drinking local water and inhaling contaminated dust. Furthermore, due to absorption by plants and livestock, toxins—many of which bioaccumulate and are not easily broken down or excreted by the liver and kidneys—entered the food chain. Inhabitants of the surrounding areas commonly experience a shortage of fresh water, and health problems are widespread—including high rates of certain cancers, respiratory illnesses including tuberculosis (mostly drug resistant), digestive disorders, anaemia, and infectious diseases. Liver, kidney, and eye problems may also be due to the toxic dust storms. Together, this presented an unusually high fatality rate among vulnerable age groups: child mortality stood at 75 per 1,000 in 2009, while maternal mortality was 12 in every 1,000.

The dust storms have also contributed to water shortages through salt deposition. Overusing pesticides on crops to preserve yields has exacerbated this. Crops are destroyed where salt is deposited by the wind. The most heavily affected fields must be flushed with water four times per day to remove salt and toxic matter. A 1998 study indicated that few crops (besides fodder) tolerate the degradation, restricting what Kazakhstan farmers now choose to seed.

Inland seas and lakes generally moderate a region's climate through humidification, regulation of thermal energy, and peri-winter albedo effects. Loss of water in the Aral Sea has changed surface temperatures and wind patterns. This has led to a broader annual temperature range (about a 4 to 12 °C broadening) and more dust in storms locally and regionally.

=== Biology ===
The Aral Sea fishing industry, which at its peak employed some 40,000 and reportedly produced one-sixth of the Soviet Union's entire fish catch, has been devastated. In the 1980s commercial harvests were becoming unsustainable, and by 1987 commercial harvest became nonexistent. Due to the declining sea levels, salinity levels became too high for the 20 native fish species to survive. Of the commercially important fish, only the introduced European flounder could survive the high salinity levels. Also, as water has receded, former fishing towns along the original shores have become ship graveyards.

Aral, originally the main fishing port, is now about 15 kilometres from the sea and has seen its population decline dramatically since the beginning of the crisis. The town of Moynaq in Uzbekistan had a thriving harbour and fishing industry that employed about 30,000 people; now it lies 30–90 kilometres from the shore. Fishing boats lie scattered on the dry dusty land that was once covered by water; many have been there for 20 years.

The South Aral Sea remains too saline to host any species other than halotolerant organisms. The South Aral has been incapable of supporting fish since the late 1990s, when the flounder were killed by rising salinity levels.

Also destroyed is the muskrat-trapping industry in the deltas of the Amu Darya and Syr Darya, which used to yield as many as 500,000 pelts a year.

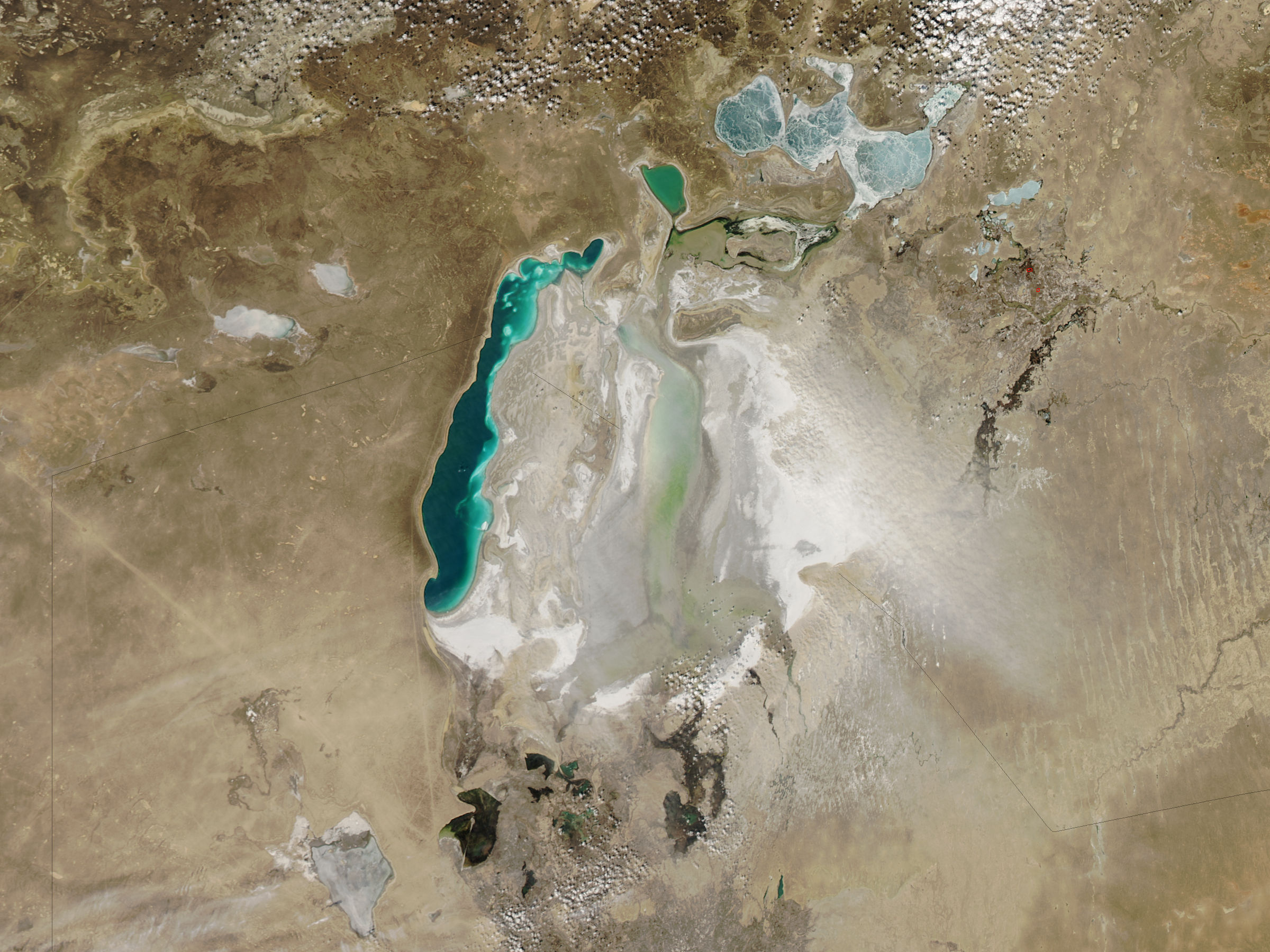
Aral Sea dust storm, March 2010

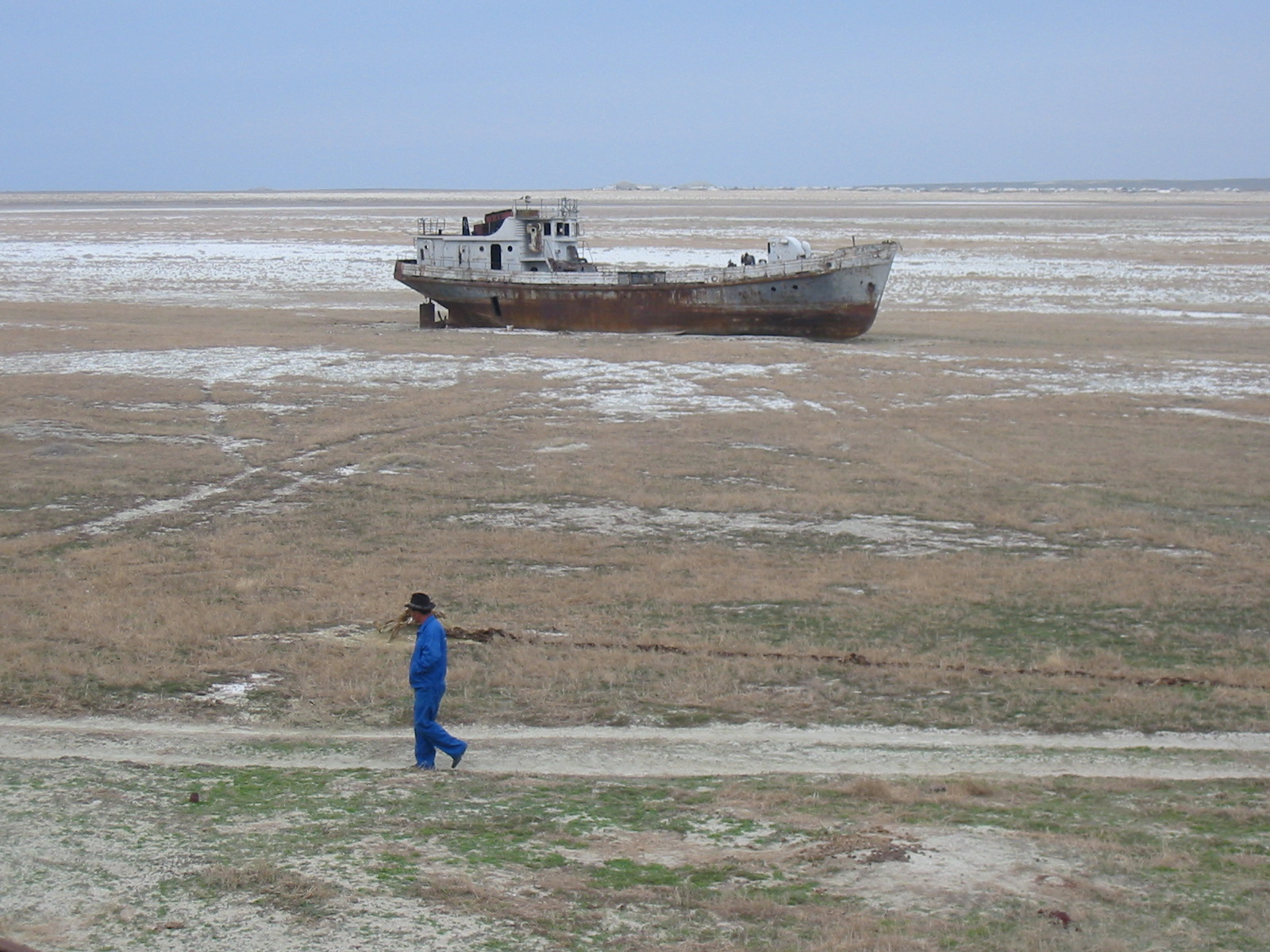
Abandoned ship near Aral, Kazakhstan

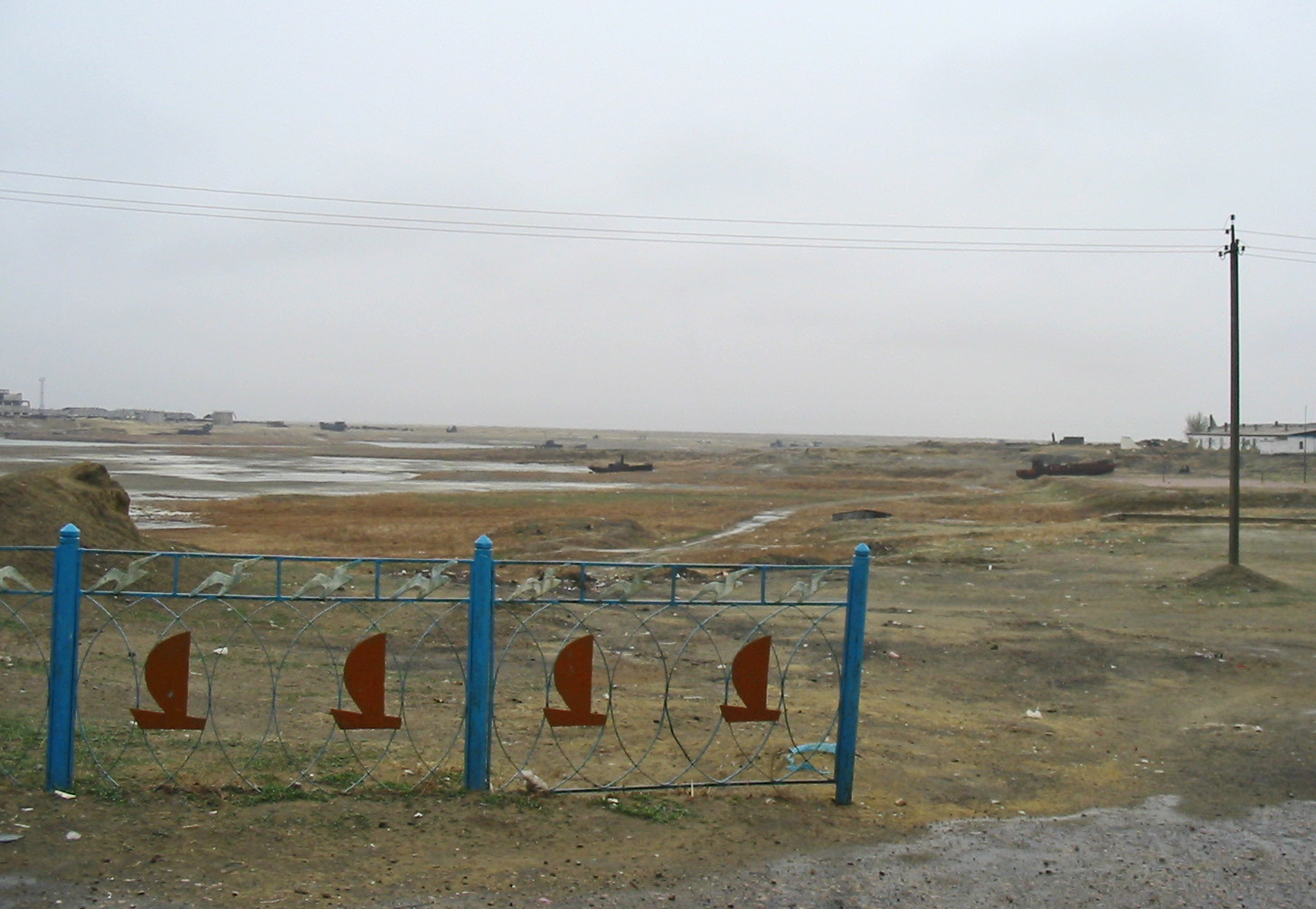
A former harbour in the city of Aral

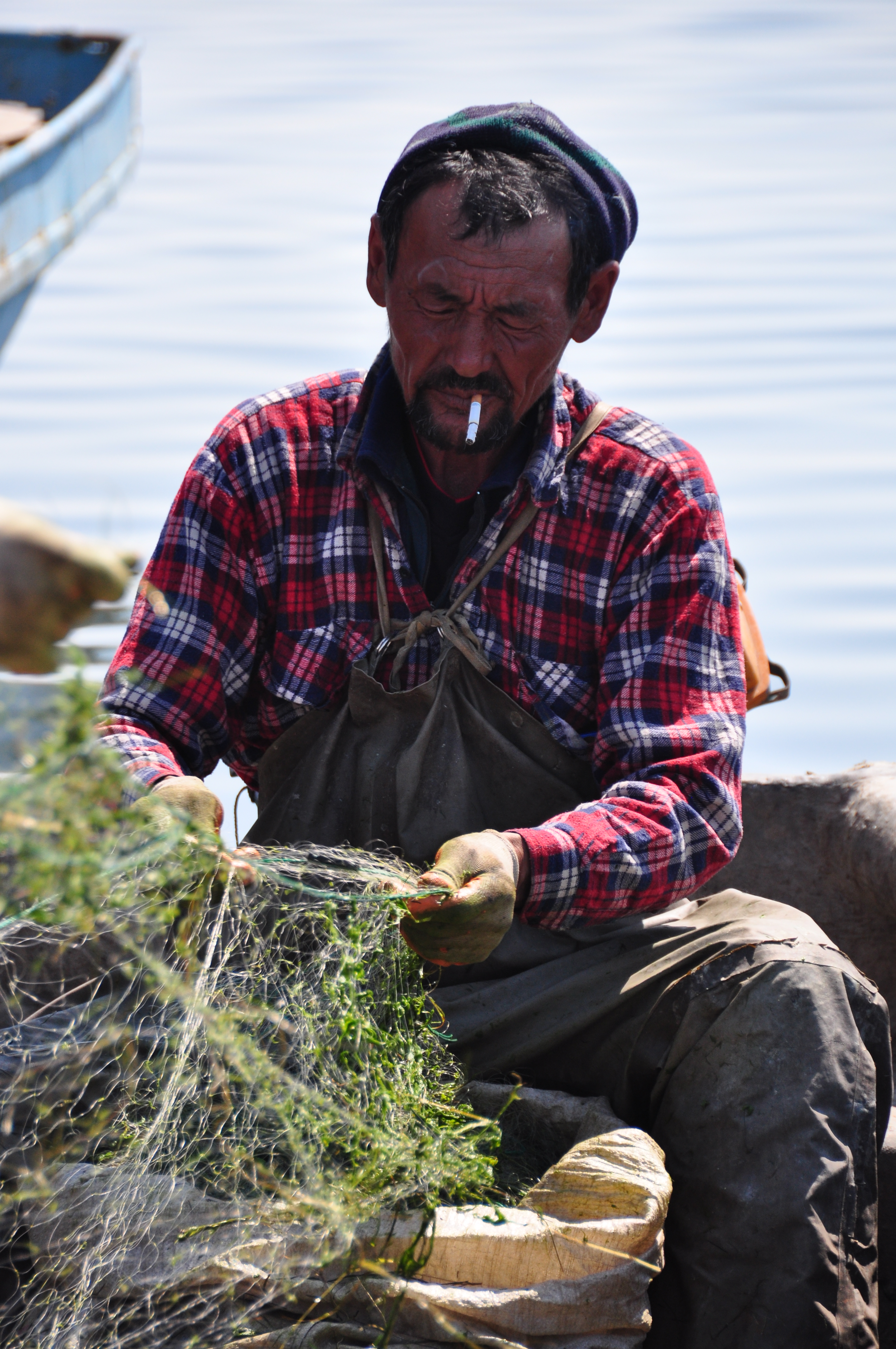
Local Kazakh fisherman harvesting the day's catch

=== Vulnerable populations ===
Local inhabitants are the most vulnerable population in this environmental health crisis due to the highly polluted and salinated water used for drinking and the dried seabed. Toxic chemicals associated with pesticide use have been found in blood and breast milk of mothers; specifically organochlorides, polychlorinated biphenyl compounds (PCBs), DDT compounds, and TCDD. These toxins can be, and often are, passed on to the children of these mothers, resulting in low birthweight and congenital abnormalities. The rate of infants being born with abnormalities is five times higher in this region than in European countries. The Aral Sea region has 26% of its children born at low birthweight, which is two standard deviations away from a national population study gathered by the WHO.

Exposures to toxic chemicals from the dry seabed and polluted water have caused other health issues in women and children. Renal tubular dysfunction has become a large health concern in children in the Aral Sea region as it is showing extremely high prevalence rates. Renal tubular dysfunction can also be related to growth and developmental stunting. This, in conjunction with the already high rate of low-birthweight children and children born with abnormalities, contributes to severe negative health effects and outcomes for children. These issues are compounded by the lack of research on maternal and child health effects caused by the demise of the Aral Sea. For example, only 26 English-language peer-reviewed articles and four reports on children's health were produced between 1994 and 2008. In addition, there is a lack of health infrastructure and resources in the Aral Sea region to combat the health issues that have arisen.

There is a lack of medication and equipment in many medical facilities, so health professionals do not have access to the necessary supplies to do their jobs in the Kazakhstan and Uzbekistan regions. There is also meager development of a health information system that would allow for extensive research or surveillance of emerging health issues due to Aral Sea issues. An absence of a primary care approach in the health systems of this region also hinders services and access that could prevent and treat issues stemming from the Aral Sea crisis, especially in women and children.

The impoverished are also particularly vulnerable to the environmental and health related effects of changes to the Aral Sea. These populations were most likely to reside downstream from the Basin and in former coastal communities. They were also among the first to be detrimentally affected, representing at least 4.4 million people in the region. Considered to have the worst health in this region, their plight was not helped when their fishery livelihoods vanished with the decreasing levels of water and loss of many aquatic species. Thus, those in poverty are entrenched in a vicious cycle.

== Solutions ==
=== Proposed environmental solutions ===
Many different solutions to the problems have been suggested over the years, varying in feasibility and cost, including:

- Improving the quality of irrigation canals
- Using alternative cotton species that require less water
- Promoting non-agricultural economic development in upstream countries
- Using fewer chemicals on the cotton
- Cultivating crops other than cotton
- Redirecting water from the Volga, Ob and Irtysh rivers to restore the Aral Sea to its former size in 20–30 years at a cost of US$30–50 billion
- Pumping sea water into the Aral Sea from the Caspian Sea via a pipeline, and diluting it with fresh water from local catchment areas

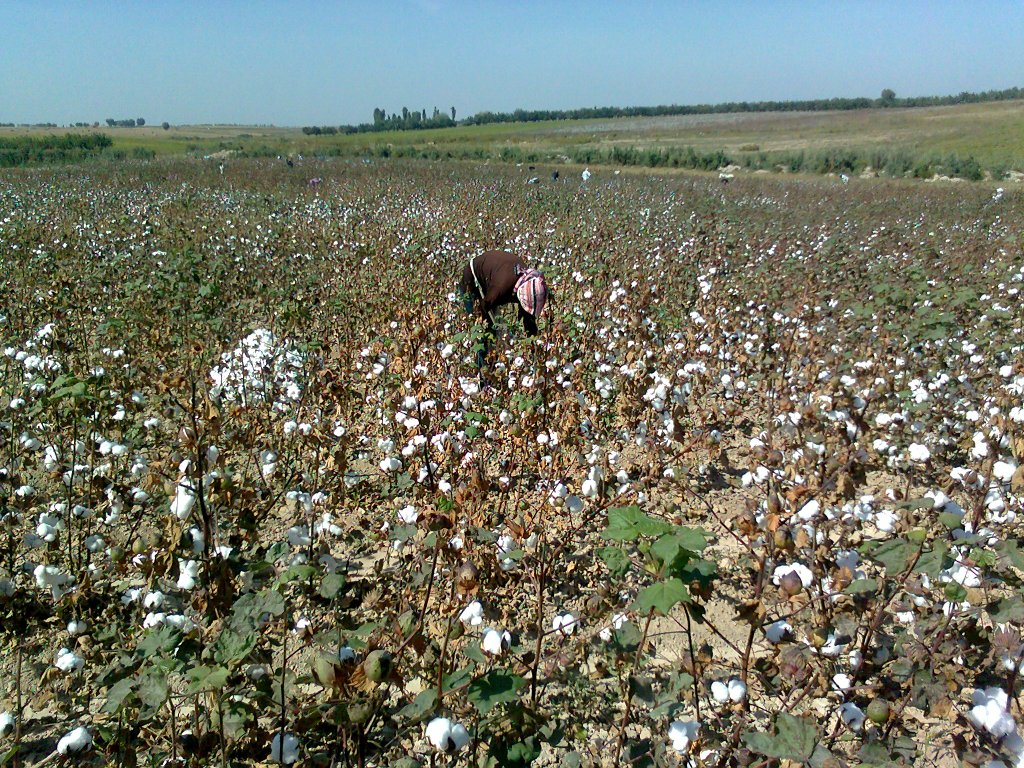
Cotton picking in Uzbekistan. Cotton is one of the most water-intensive plants.

In January 1994, Kazakhstan, Uzbekistan, Turkmenistan, Tajikistan, and Kyrgyzstan signed a deal to pledge 1% of their budgets to help the sea recover.

In March 2000, UNESCO presented their "Water-related vision for the Aral Sea basin for the year 2025".

By 2006, the World Bank's restoration projects, especially in the North Aral, were giving rise to some unexpected, tentative relief in what had been an extremely pessimistic picture.

=== Restoration strategies ===
The International Fund for Saving the Aral Sea (IFAS) is an intergovernmental organization whose goal is to finance and support collaborative initiatives and ecological, social, and technical projects aimed at addressing the catastrophic environmental and human impacts caused by the Aral Sea's desiccation, attributed to unsustainable irrigation practices during the Soviet era.

The IFAS's work has been divided into four programs. The Aral Sea Basin Programme's (ASBP) four objectives are:

- stabilize the environment of the Aral Sea Basin
- rehabilitate the disaster area around the sea
- improve the management of the international waters of the Aral Sea Basin
- build the capacity of institutions at the regional and national level to advance the programme's aims

==== ASBP-1 ====
The first phase was ineffectual for a number of reasons, but mainly because it was focused on directly improving the land around the Aral Sea, whilst not intervening in the water usage upstream. There was considerable concern amongst the Central Asian governments, which realised the importance of the Aral Sea in the ecosystem and the economy of Central Asia, and they were prepared to cooperate, but they found it difficult to implement the procedures of the plan.

This is due in part to a lack of co-operation among the affected people. The water flowing into the Aral Sea has long been considered an important commodity, and trade agreements have been made to supply the downstream communities with water in the spring and summer months for irrigation. In return, they supply the upstream countries with fuel during the winter, instead of storing water during the warm months for hydroelectric purposes in winter. However, very few legal obligations are binding these contracts, particularly on an international stage.

==== ASBP: Phase Two ====
Phase Two of the Aral Sea Basin programme followed in 1998 and ran for five years. The main shortcomings of phase two were due to its lack of integration with the local communities involved. The scheme was drawn up by the World Bank, government representatives, and various technical experts, without consulting those who would be affected. An example of this was the public awareness initiatives, which were seen as propagandist attempts by people with little care or understanding of their situation. These failures have led to the introduction of a new plan, funded by a number of institutions, including the five countries involved and the World Bank.

==== ASBP: Phase Three ====
In 1997, a new plan was conceived which would continue with the previous restoration efforts of the Aral Sea. The main aims of this phase are to improve the irrigation systems currently in place, whilst targeting water management at a local level. The largest project in this phase is the North Aral Sea Project, a direct effort to recover the northern region of the Aral Sea. The North Aral Sea Project's main initiative is the construction of a dam across the Berg Strait, a deep channel which connects the North Aral Sea to the South Aral Sea. The Kok-Aral Dam is 13 kilometres (8 miles) long and has capacity for over 29 cubic kilometres of water to be stored in the North Aral Sea, whilst allowing excess to overflow into the South Aral Sea.

=== Aral Sea Basin Programme – 2 ===
On 6 October 2002, the Heads of States met again to revise the ASBP program. ASBP-2 was in place from 2003 to 2010. The main purpose of the ASBP-2 was to set up projects that covered a vast amount of environmental, socioeconomic and water management issues. The ASBP-2 was financed by organization such as the UNDP, World Bank, USAID, Asian Development Bank, and the governments of Switzerland, Japan, Finland, Norway and others. Over 2 billion US Dollars was provided by the IFAS country members to the program.

=== Aral Sea Basin Programme – 3 ===
On 28 April 2009, the Heads of States came together with the Interstate commission for Water Coordination, Interstate Commission for Sustainable Development and National Experts and donors to develop the ASBP-3. This Program was in effect from 2011- 2015. The main purpose of the ASBP-3 was to improve the environmental and socio-economic situation of the Aral Sea Basin. The four program priorities were:

- Direction one: Integrated Use of Water Resources
- Direction two: Environmental protection
- Direction three: Socio-economic Development
- Direction four: Improving the institutional and legal instruments

==== ASBP-3: Direction One ====
Direction One's main purpose is to propose program that focus on addressing transboundary water resources management, establishment of monitoring systems and addressing safety concerns in water facilities. Examples of programs that have been proposed include:

- "Developing proposals to optimize the management and use of water resources in Central Asia, taking into account environmental factors, effects of climate change to meet the national interests of the Aral Sea basin."
- "Improving the quality of hydrometeorological services for weather-dependent sectors of the economy of Central Asia."
- "Creating a database and computer models for the management of transboundary water resources."
- "Assisting the countries in reducing the risk of natural disasters, including through the strengthening of regional cooperation, improve disaster preparedness and response."

==== ASBP-3: Direction Two ====
Directions two's main focus is on addressing the issues related to environmental protection and improvement of the environment. Areas of interest include:

- "The environment in the deltas of the Syr Darya and Amu Darya improved."
- "Mountain environments improved."
- "The environment and productivity of pastures improved."
- "A regional information system on the environment established."

==== ASBP-3: Direction Three ====
Direction three looks to address socio-economic issues by focusing on education and public health, improving unemployment rates, improving water systems, increasing sustainable development and improving living conditions. The expected outputs are:

- "An improved access to safe drinking water."
- "For the rural population: establishment and/or development of private small enterprises, creation of new jobs, and increased labor efficiency."
- "An improvement in the quality of medical services"
- "An improvement in the effectiveness and quality of education in schools and pre-school facilities in rural areas."

==== ASBP-3: Direction Four ====
Direction Four aims to address issues related to institutional development and the development of policies and strategies that relate to sustainable development and public awareness. Expected outputs include:

- "Conditions for a transparent and mutually beneficial regional dialogue and cooperation, including setting up a sectorial dialogue between governments established."
- "A Prototype of the single information and analysis system for the water sector established."
- "A Communication Strategy for stakeholders and the public established."
- "Training systems for the water sector and the hydrometeorological services in Central Asia improved."

==== Technology ====
Funded in part by the United Nations Development Programme, implementations in Kazakhstan such as laser levelling and irrigation optimization using energy-efficient technologies has shown effectiveness.

=== North Aral Sea restoration work ===
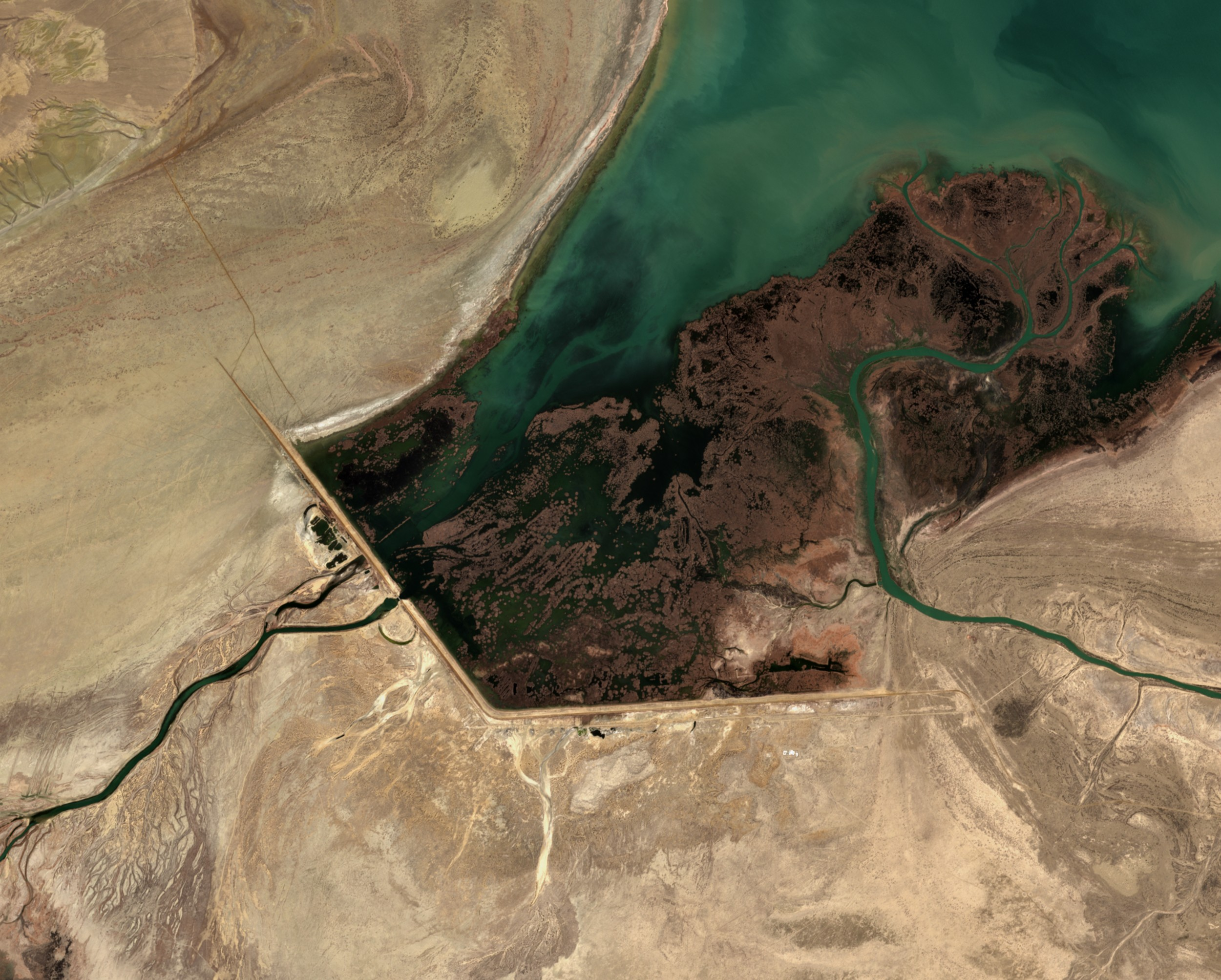
Dike Kokaral

Comparison of the North Aral Sea in 2000 and 2011.

Work is being done to restore in part the North Aral Sea. Irrigation works on the Syr Darya have been repaired and improved to increase its water flow, and in October 2003, the Kazakh government announced a plan to build Dike Kokaral, a concrete dam separating the two halves of the Aral Sea. Work on this dam was completed in August 2005; since then, the water level of the North Aral has risen, and its salinity has decreased. As of 2006, some recovery of sea level has been recorded, sooner than expected. "The dam has caused the small Aral's sea level to rise swiftly to 38 m (125 ft), from a low of less than 30 m (98 ft), with 42 m (138 ft) considered the level of viability."

Economically significant stocks of fish have returned, and observers who had written off the North Aral Sea as an environmental disaster were surprised by unexpected reports that, in 2006, its returning waters were already partly reviving the fishing industry and producing catches for export as far as Ukraine. The improvements to the fishing industry were largely due to the drop in the average salinity of the sea from 30 grams to 8 grams per liter; this drop in salinity prompted the return of almost 24 freshwater species. The restoration also reportedly gave rise to long-absent rain clouds and possible microclimate changes, bringing tentative hope to an agricultural sector swallowed by a regional dustbowl, and some expansion of the shrunken sea.

The sea, which had receded almost 100 km (62 mi) south of the port-city of Aralsk, is now a mere 25 km (16 mi) away. The Kazakh Foreign Ministry stated that "The North Aral Sea's surface increased from 2,550 square kilometers (980 sq mi) in 2003 to 3,300 square kilometers (1,300 sq mi) in 2008. The sea's depth increased from 30 meters (98 ft) in 2003 to 42 meters (138 ft) in 2008." Now, a second dam is to be built based on a World Bank loan to Kazakhstan, with the start of construction initially slated for 2009 and postponed to 2011, to further expand the shrunken Northern Aral, eventually reducing the distance to Aralsk to only 6 km (3.7 mi). Then, it was planned to build a canal spanning the last 6 km, to reconnect the withered former port of Aralsk to the sea.

On 15 June 2021 the Central Communications Service of Kazakhstan announced that they plan to plant saxaul trees on one million hectares of the drained bottom of the Aral Sea as part of efforts to stop dust storms on the region. Other efforts include expanding the sea's water level.

=== Future of South Aral Sea ===
The South Aral Sea, half of which lies in Uzbekistan, was abandoned to its fate. Most of Uzbekistan's part of the Aral Sea is completely desiccated. Only excess water from the North Aral Sea is periodically allowed to flow into the largely dried-up South Aral Sea through a sluice in the dike. Discussions had been held on recreating a channel between the somewhat improved North and the desiccated South, along with uncertain wetland restoration plans throughout the region, but political will is lacking. Unlike Kazakhstan, which has partially revived its part of the Aral Sea, Uzbekistan shows no signs of abandoning the Amu Darya river to irrigate their cotton, and is moving toward oil exploration in the drying South Aral seabed.

Attempts to mitigate the effects of desertification include planting vegetation in the newly exposed seabed; however, intermittent flooding of the eastern basin is likely to prove problematic for any development. Redirecting what little flow there is from the Amu Darya to the western basin may salvage fisheries there while relieving the flooding of the eastern basin. The reforestation is focused on plants adapted to desert conditions such as Haloxylon ammodendron, Ephedra strobilacea, Salsola species, and Tamarix species. The eventual aim is to plant up to 200,000 hectares (490,000 acres) of forest in the Uzbekistan portion. The forest is intended to slow desertification and reduce the impact of sandstorms on nearby communities.

== Institutional bodies ==
The Interstate Commission for Water Coordination of Central Asia (ICWC) was formed on 18 February 1992 to formally unite Kazakhstan, Kyrgyzstan, Tajikistan, Turkmenistan and Uzbekistan in the hopes of solving environmental, as well as socioeconomic problems in the Aral Sea region. The River Basin Organizations (the BVOs) of the Syr Darya and Amu Darya rivers were institutions called upon by the ICWC to help manage water resources. According to the ICWC, the main objectives of the body are:

- River basin management
- Water allocation without conflict
- Organization of water conservation on transboundary water courses
- Interaction with hydrometeorological services of the countries on flow forecast and account
- Introduction of automation into head structures
- Regular work on ICWC and its bodies' activity advancement
- Interstate agreements preparation
- International relations
- Scientific research
- Training

The International Fund for Saving the Aral Sea (IFAS) was developed on 23 March 1993, by the ICWC to raise funds for the projects under Aral Sea Basin programmes. The IFAS was meant to finance programmes to save the sea and improve on environmental issues associated with the basin's drying. This programme has had some success with joint summits of the countries involved and finding funding from the World Bank to implement projects; however, it faces many challenges, such as enforcement and slowing progress.

== Vozrozhdeniya Island ==
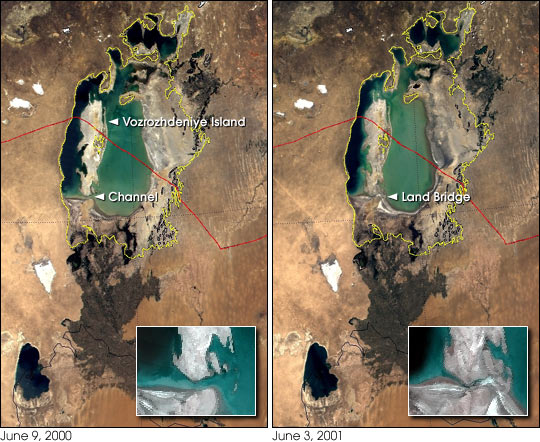
"Rebirth" Island joins the mainland in mid-2001.

Vozrozhdeniya (Russian for rebirth) Island was an island of the Aral Sea or South Aral Sea. Due to the ongoing shrinkage of the Aral, it became first a peninsula in mid-2001 and finally part of the mainland. Other islands like Kokaral and Barsa-Kelmes shared a similar fate. Since the disappearance of the Southeast Aral in 2008, Vozrozhdeniya Island effectively no longer exists as a distinct geographical feature. The area is now shared by Kazakhstan and Uzbekistan.

In 1948, a top-secret Soviet bioweapons laboratory was established on the island, in the centre of the Aral Sea which is now disputed territory between Kazakhstan and Uzbekistan. The exact history, functions and current status of this facility are still unclear, but bio-agents tested there included Bacillus anthracis, Coxiella burnetii, Francisella tularensis, Brucella suis, Rickettsia prowazekii, Variola major (smallpox), Yersinia pestis, botulinum toxin, and Venezuelan equine encephalitis virus.

In 1971, weaponized smallpox from the island reached a nearby ship, which then allowed the virus to spread to the city of Aral. Ten people there were infected, of whom three died, and a massive vaccination effort involving 50,000 inhabitants ensued (see Aral smallpox incident). The bioweapons base was abandoned in 1992 following the disintegration of the Soviet Union the previous year. Scientific expeditions proved this had been a site for production, testing and later dumping of pathogenic weapons. In 2002, through a project organized by the United States and with Uzbekistan's assistance, 10 anthrax burial sites were decontaminated. According to the Kazakh Scientific Center for Quarantine and Zoonotic Infections, all burial sites of anthrax were decontaminated.

== Oil and gas exploration ==
Ergash Shaismatov, the deputy prime minister of Uzbekistan, announced on 30 August 2006, that the Uzbek government and an international consortium consisting of state-run Uzbekneftegaz, LUKoil Overseas, Petronas, Korea National Oil Corporation, and China National Petroleum Corporation signed a production-sharing agreement to explore and develop oil and gas fields in the Aral Sea, saying, "The Aral Sea is largely unknown, but it holds a lot of promise in terms of finding oil and gas. There is risk, of course, but we believe in the success of this unique project." The consortium was created in September 2005.

As of 1 June 2010, 500,000 cubic meters of gas had been extracted, from 3 km down.

== See also ==
- List of drying lakes
- Dead Sea
- Tulare Lake – California's largest lake, drained between 1880 and 1970
- Colorado River Delta – a similarly damaged ecosystem
- Sudd – a large marshland in Africa, site of another planned large-scale draining project, the Jonglei Canal
- Aralosaurus
- Draining of the Mesopotamian marshes – a similar water diversion project in Iraq
- Environmental issues in Kazakhstan

== Sources ==
- Aladin, Nikolay Vasilevich; Gontar, Valentina Ivanovna; Zhakova, Ljubov Vasilevna; Plotnikov, Igor Svetozarovich; Smurov, Alexey Olegovich; Rzymski, Piotr; Klimaszyk, Piotr (January 2019). "The zoocenosis of the Aral Sea: six decades of fast-paced change". Environmental Science and Pollution Research. 26 (3): 2228–2237. Bibcode:2019ESPR...26.2228A. doi:10.1007/s11356-018-3807-z. PMC 6338704. PMID 30484051.
- Bissell, Tom (April 2002). "Eternal Winter: Lessons of the Aral Sea Disaster". Harper's. pp. 41–56. Archived from the original on 6 July 2008.
- Bissell, Tom (2004). Chasing The Sea: Lost Among the Ghosts of Empire in Central Asia. New York: Vintage Books. ISBN 978-0-375-72754-2.
- Borroffka, Nikolaus G.O. (2010), "Archaeology and Its Relevance to Climate and Water Level Changes: A Review", in Kostianoy, Andrey G.; Kosarev, Aleksey N. (eds.), The Aral Sea Environment, Heidelberg: Springer-Verlag, pp. 283–303
- Cretaux, Jean-François; Letolle, René; Bergé-Nguyen, Muriel (November 2013). "History of Aral Sea level variability and current scientific debates". Global and Planetary Change. 110: 99–113. Bibcode:2013GPC...110...99C. doi:10.1016/j.gloplacha.2013.05.006.
- Ellis, William S (February 1990). "A Soviet Sea Lies Dying". National Geographic. pp. 73–93.
- Ermakhanov, Z. K.; Plotnikov, I. S.; Aladin, N. V.; Micklin, P. (March 2012). "Changes in the Aral Sea ichthyofauna and fishery during the period of ecological crisis". Lakes & Reservoirs: Science, Policy and Management for Sustainable Use. 17 (1): 3–9. Bibcode:2012LRRM...17....3E. doi:10.1111/j.1440-1770.2012.00492.x.
- Ferguson, Rob (2003). The Devil and the Disappearing Sea. Vancouver: Raincoast Books. ISBN 1-55192-599-0.
- Kapuscinski, Ryszard (2019). Imperium: With an Afterword by Margaret Atwood. Granta Books. ISBN 978-1-78378-525-4.
- Kasperson, Jeanne; Kasperson, Roger; Turner, B.L (1995). The Aral Sea Basin: A Man-Made Environmental Catastrophe. Dordrecht; Boston: Kluwer Academic Publishers. p. 92. ISBN 92-808-0848-6.
- Kropotkin, Peter Alexeivitch (1911). "Aral" . In Chisholm, Hugh (ed.). Encyclopædia Britannica. Vol. 2 (11th ed.). Cambridge University Press. pp. 316–317.
- Benduhn, François; Renard, Philippe (June 2004). "A dynamic model of the Aral Sea water and salt balance". Journal of Marine Systems. 47 (1–4): 35–50. Bibcode:2004JMS....47...35B. doi:10.1016/j.jmarsys.2003.12.007.
- Micklin, Philip (2007). "The Aral Sea Disaster". Annual Review of Earth and Planetary Sciences. 35 (4): 47–72. Bibcode:2007AREPS..35...47M. doi:10.1146/annurev.earth.35.031306.140120.
- Sirjacobs, Damien; Grégoire, Marilaure; Delhez, Eric; Nihoul, JCJ (2004). "Influence of the Aral Sea negative water balance on its seasonal circulation patterns: use of a 3D hydrodynamic model". Journal of Marine Systems. 47 (1–4): 51–66. Bibcode:2004JMS....47...51S. doi:10.1016/j.jmarsys.2003.12.008. hdl:2268/2793.
- Sun, Fangdi; Ma, Ronghua (14 June 2019). "Hydrologic changes of Aral Sea: A reveal by the combination of radar altimeter data and optical images". Annals of GIS. 25 (3): 247–261. Bibcode:2019AnGIS..25..247S. doi:10.1080/19475683.2019.1626909.
