= Public health problems in the Aral Sea region =

Beginning in 1960, After irrigation projects in the Soviet Union diverted water from the Aral Sea, it began to dry up and leave behind salts, other minerals and toxins in the soil alongside the coastline and in the area. This not only contaminated the soil but was also picked up by winds and storms, and traveled to other areas, including over crop lands and river systems in modern day Uzbekistan, Kazakhstan, Kyrgyzstan, Tajikistan, and Turkmenistan.

This has led to increased health problems like respiratory diseases and cancers, among multiple other linked health effects in the approximately 3.5 million to 4 million people who live directly in the immediate disaster zone surrounding the Aral salt lake basin. The change in the size of the Aral Sea has also affected the local climate and resulted in increased occurrences and worsening of storms.

== Background ==
There is no doubt that the shrinking of the Aral Sea has resulted in health problems for the local community. However, there is debate as to what extent of these problems can be sourced to this environmental situation. The full effects could take a generation to fully materialize and patterns of health problems to show up. Some of the main reasons why the Aral sea area suffered greatly were from "over irrigation and water mismanagement." Environmental impacts resulting from the changes in the Aral Sea region that could affect human health are "the salinization of the water table, pesticides in the environment and food chain, dust storms and air quality."

In the Soviet period, water from the Amu Darya and Syr Darya rivers that had previously flowed into the Aral Sea was redirected into the cotton fields of Uzbekistan. Grazings and gainful grounds of Amu Darya and Syr Darya employed more than 100 thousand individuals in the fields of poultry, harvest development and livestock. In the Uzbek region years of monoculture agriculture of cotton fields left soils depleted of naturally occurring minerals and nutrients. This eventually led to an increased use of pesticides and fertilizers to try to counter these new soil deficiencies. However, these increased chemicals found their way into the soils, water, and finally the Aral Sea. These types of agricultural activities have also "resulted in widespread soil erosion, chemical pollution, and poor water quality and quantity."

Health infrastructure, including hospitals and medical centers, in the Aral Sea region are in need of fundamental medical tools, and other equipment for improving health services. Medical staff does not have necessary conditions to successfully accomplish their job.

== Effects on infant mortality rates ==
As the sea dries up, the contaminants become exposed on the surface and enter the soil, while also being blown in the air. This has adversely affected the health of local residents. Around 35 million people live near the Aral Sea Basin, of whom 3.5 million live in the disaster area. Increases in many diseases and conditions have been noted and linked to the shrinking of the Aral. Infants and children face the highest risk from exposure to contaminants and toxins, leading to an increasing infant mortality rate in the area. According to Newbold the infant mortality rate is defined as "the number of deaths of infants younger than one year of age per one thousand births."

Infant mortality rates have been increasing in this region since the 1970s, while elsewhere in the world they have generally been going down. Residents of the Aral sea region have suffered high "exposure to industrial pollutants such as polychlorinated biphenyl (PCB) compounds and heavy metals but also to pesticides." This has led to increased infant mortality rates: as high as 70 per 1000 in Kazakhstan as of 1993. Toxins can be absorbed by breathing them in from the air, drinking water, and from food. It has been found that these contaminants can be passed down through breast feeding and "in a number of areas the physicians recommend against breast feeding babies, as the nursing mother's milk is toxic."

The table shows that infant mortality rates have also increased in other surrounding countries and areas. Although many other factors contribute to infant mortality rates, the environmental state in the area has a definite influence on increasing rates. When compared with developed countries these rates can illustrate differences in health care and access to health care between the areas.

== Infant mortality rates, 1985–2008 ==
Infant mortality rates in Aral Sea region, with other countries for comparison
	1985–1990	1990–1995	1995–2000	2004	2008
Afghanistan	170	160	152	165	163
Kazakhstan	36	35	35	52	29
Kyrgyzstan	45	40	40	42	50
Tajikistan	58	57	57	50	65
Turkmenistan	58	55	55	74	74
Uzbekistan	53	44	44	62	48
United Kingdom				5.3	4.9
Canada				5.2	5.4
USA				6.7	6.6

== List of adverse health effects ==
In Turkmenistan alone, 50% of all reported illnesses in children are related to respiratory system difficulties. The effects of this situation are far reaching and affect people in a wide range of ailments. Following is a list of health problems contributing to high infant mortality, death, and lower standard of living in the Aral Sea area:

- diarrheal diseases
- vaccine preventable diseases such as tuberculosis
- nutritional deficiencies
- upper respiratory tract infections
- teratogenesis
- endocrine disruption
- neurodevelopmental effects
- behavioral effects
- gastro-enteritis
- typhoid fever
- hepatitis
- esophageal cancer
- various other cancers
- hypertension
- heart disease
- anemia
- kidney disease
- eye disease

== Solutions ==
A large concern of remediation of the area is the reduction of the blowing salt and minerals from the exposed sea bed. Some solutions include constructing dikes to control water flows and restricting the water amounts diverted for irrigation. However, the health effects have already been felt and will continue to be present for a long time even if the situation is turned around in the very near future.
