= Caspiohydrobia =

Scientific classification
- Kingdom: Animalia
- Phylum: Mollusca
- Class: Gastropoda
- Subclass: Caenogastropoda
- Order: Littorinimorpha
- Family: Hydrobiidae
- Genus: Caspiohydrobia; Starobogatov, 1970

Genus of snails

Caspiohydrobia is a genus of gastropods belonging to the family Hydrobiidae.

The species of this genus are found in Caspian Sea.

Species:

- Caspiohydrobia aralensis Starobogatov & Andreeva, 1981
- Caspiohydrobia behningi Starobogatov & Andreeva, 1981
- Caspiohydrobia bergi Starobogatov & Andreeva, 1981
- Caspiohydrobia borealis Andreeva & Frolova, 1989
- Caspiohydrobia carinata (Gillet & Geissert, 1971)
- Caspiohydrobia chrysopsis (V.P.Kolesnikov, 1947)
- Caspiohydrobia conica (Logvinenko & Starobogatov, 1969)
- Caspiohydrobia coniformis Starobogatov & Izzatullaev, 1974
- Caspiohydrobia convexa (Logvinenko & Starobogatov, 1966)
- Caspiohydrobia curta (Logvinenko & Starobogatov, 1969)
- Caspiohydrobia cylindrica (Logvinenko & Starobogatov, 1969)
- Caspiohydrobia dubia (Logvinenko & Starobogatov, 1969)
- Caspiohydrobia eichwaldiana (Golikov & Starobogatov, 1966)
- Caspiohydrobia eleganta Badzoshvili, 1979
- Caspiohydrobia elongata Starobogatov & Izzatullaev, 1974
- Caspiohydrobia gemmata (V.P.Kolesnikov, 1947)
- Caspiohydrobia husainovae (Starobogatov, 1974)
- Caspiohydrobia johanseni Frolova, 1984
- Caspiohydrobia kazakhstanica Starobogatov & Andreeva, 1981
- Caspiohydrobia ljaurica Starobogatov & Izzatullaev, 1974
- Caspiohydrobia nikitinskii Starobogatov & Andreeva, 1981
- Caspiohydrobia nikolskii Starobogatov & Andreeva, 1981
- Caspiohydrobia obrutchevi Starobogatov & Andreeva, 1981
- Caspiohydrobia oviformis (Logvinenko & Starobogatov, 1969)
- Caspiohydrobia parva (Logvinenko & Starobogatov, 1969)
- Caspiohydrobia pavlovskii Starobogatov & Izzatullaev, 1974
- Caspiohydrobia sidorovi Starobogatov & Andreeva, 1981
- Caspiohydrobia sogdiana Starobogatov & Izzatullaev, 1974
- Caspiohydrobia starobogatovi Iljina, 1976
- Caspiohydrobia subconvexa (Logvinenko & Starobogatov, 1969)
- Caspiohydrobia tadzhikistanica Starobogatov & Izzatullaev, 1974
- Caspiohydrobia tamanensis Iljina, 1976
- Caspiohydrobia turrita (Logvinenko & Starobogatov, 1969)
