= Karakol, Shalkar District =

Lake in Kazakhstan

Karakol
- Қаракөл
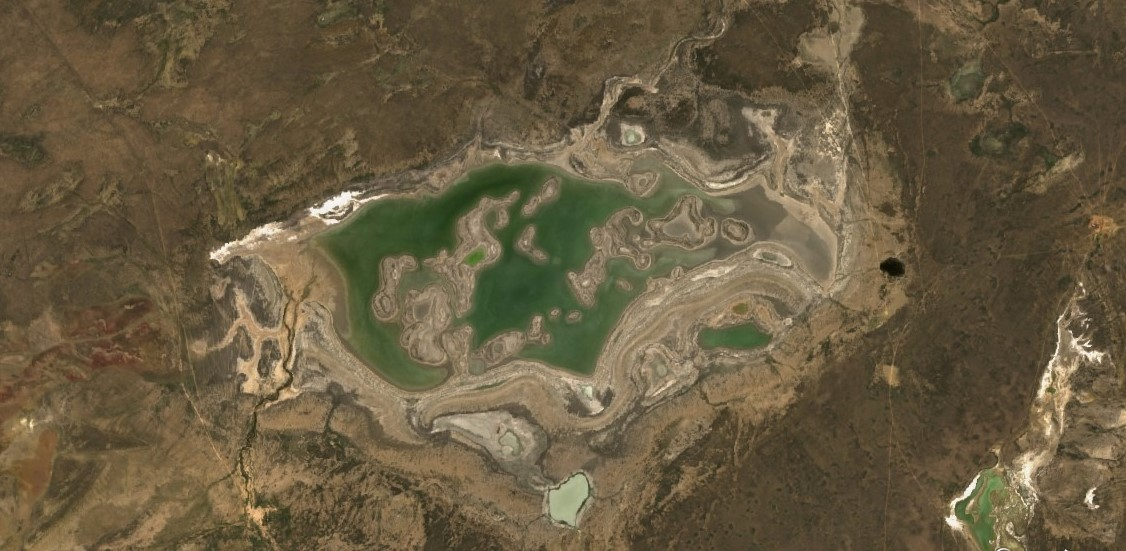
- Sentinel-2 picture of the lake

- Location within Kazakhstan
- Location: Shalkar Basin
- Coordinates: 48°05′45″N 59°31′20″E
- Type: endorheic lake
- Basin countries: Kazakhstan
- Max. length: 7 kilometers (4.3 mi)
- Max. width: 3 kilometers (1.9 mi)
- Surface area: 10 square kilometers (3.9 sq mi)
- Residence time: UTC+5:00
- Surface elevation: 176 meters (577 ft)
- Islands: numerous

Karakol (Kazakh: Қаракөл) is a salt lake in Shalkar District, Aktobe Region, Kazakhstan.

The lake lies 28 kilometers (17 mi) to the north of Shalkar town, the district capital. The area near the lakeshore is used as a grazing ground for local cattle.

== Geography ==
Karakol is an endorheic lake of the Shalkar Basin. It is located at an elevation of 176 meters (577 ft). Lake Tebez lies 12 kilometers (7.5 mi) to the northeast and Zhamantuz 5 kilometers (3.1 mi) to the south of the lake. The Bolgasyn river flows eastwards 5 kilometers (3.1 mi) to the north of Karakol.

Karakol is 3.4 kilometers (2.1 mi) long and 2 kilometers (1.2 mi) wide. The central part of the lake is dotted with small islands. The shores are flat and swampy, especially on the western side. The lake fills yearly with rain and snow. Its water is salty.

== See also ==
- List of lakes of Kazakhstan
