= Zhamantuz, Shalkar District =

Lake in Kazakhstan

Zhamantuz
- Жамантұз
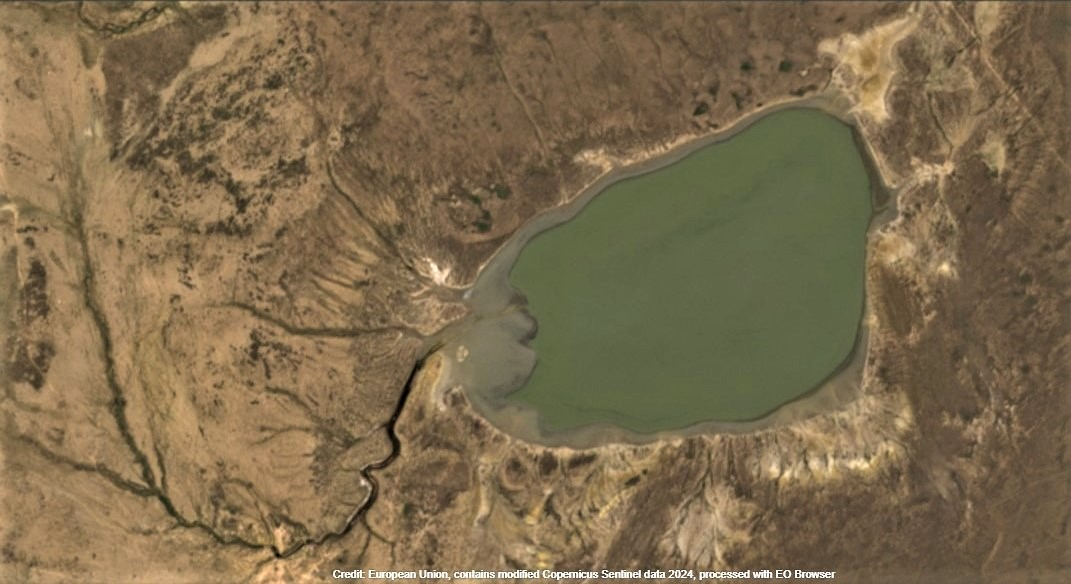
- Sentinel-2 picture of the lake

- Location within Kazakhstan
- Location: Shalkar Basin
- Coordinates: 48°01′14″N 59°31′40″E
- Type: endorheic lake
- Basin countries: Kazakhstan
- Max. length: 3 kilometers (1.9 mi)
- Max. width: 2 kilometers (1.2 mi)
- Surface area: 5 square kilometers (1.9 sq mi)
- Residence time: UTC+5:00
- Shore length^{1}: 10.5 kilometers (6.5 mi)
- Surface elevation: 178 meters (584 ft)
- Islands: no
- ^{1} Shore length is not a well-defined measure.

Zhamantuz (Kazakh: Жамантұз) is a salt lake in Shalkar District, Aktobe Region, Kazakhstan.

The lake lies about 20 kilometers (12 mi) to the NNW of Shalkar town, the district capital. The Shalkar-Aktobe railway passes 11 kilometers (6.8 mi) to the southwest of the lake.

== Geography ==
Zhamantuz is an endorheic lake of the Shalkar Basin. It is located at an elevation of 178.7 meters (586 ft). Lake Karakol lies 5 kilometers (3.1 mi) to the north and Tebez 22 kilometers (14 mi) to the NNE of the lake.

Zhamantuz is roughly 3 kilometers (1.9 mi) long and 2 kilometers (1.2 mi) wide. The shores are flat. The lake fills yearly with rain and snow. On average the highest water level is in April and the lowest in October. In some years the lake may dry completely at the end of the summer. The water of the lake is salty, hard and alkaline. A small river flows in from the west.

== Flora and fauna ==
Reeds grow in stretches of the lakeshore and steppe vegetation in the area surrounding Zhamantuz.

== See also ==
- List of lakes of Kazakhstan
