= Zhylandysay =

River in Kazakhstan

Zhylandysay Жыландысай
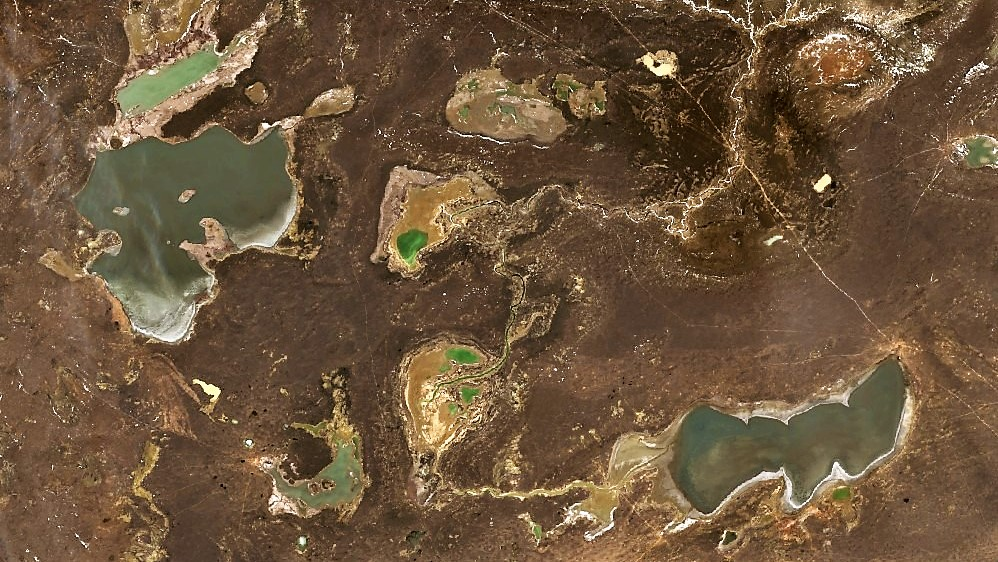
- Final stretch of river Zhylandysay and its mouth in lake Berdensor Sentinel-2 image.

- Mouth location in Kazakhstan

Location
- Countries: Kazakhstan

Physical characteristics
- Source: Mugalzhar
  - coordinates: 47°27′11″N 58°34′18″E
- Mouth: Berdensor
  - coordinates: 47°06′25″N 58°44′17″E
- Length: 104 km (65 mi)
- Basin size: 2,740 km^{2} (1,060 sq mi)

The Zhylandysay (Kazakh: Жыландысай) is a river in Shalkar District, Aktobe Region, Kazakhstan. It is 104 kilometres (65 mi) long and has a catchment area of 2,740 square kilometres (1,060 sq mi).

The river is part of the Shalkar Basin. Its floodplain is used as spring and autumn pasture for local livestock.

== Course ==
The Zhylandysay has its sources in the Shagyray Plateau, part of the southern sector of the Mugalzhar Hills, to the southwest of lake Shalkar. It heads first southeastwards, and then roughly southwards most of its course. In its final stretch it bends southwestwards and then again eastwards, entering lake Berdensor from the west. The western edge of the Greater Barsuki desert lies close to the east of its end.

The river channel is largely flat. The Zhylandysay usually reaches its highest level in the spring season when the snows melt. By the summer it largely dries up, splitting into separate ponds.

== See also ==
- List of rivers of Kazakhstan
