= Begim =

Begim may refer to:

- Begum
- Galina Begim (born 2002), Russian gymnast

== See also ==
- Begin
- Begimli
- Begimbet
