= Aralkum Desert =

Desert in the former lake bed of the Aral Sea in Uzbekistan and Kazakhstan

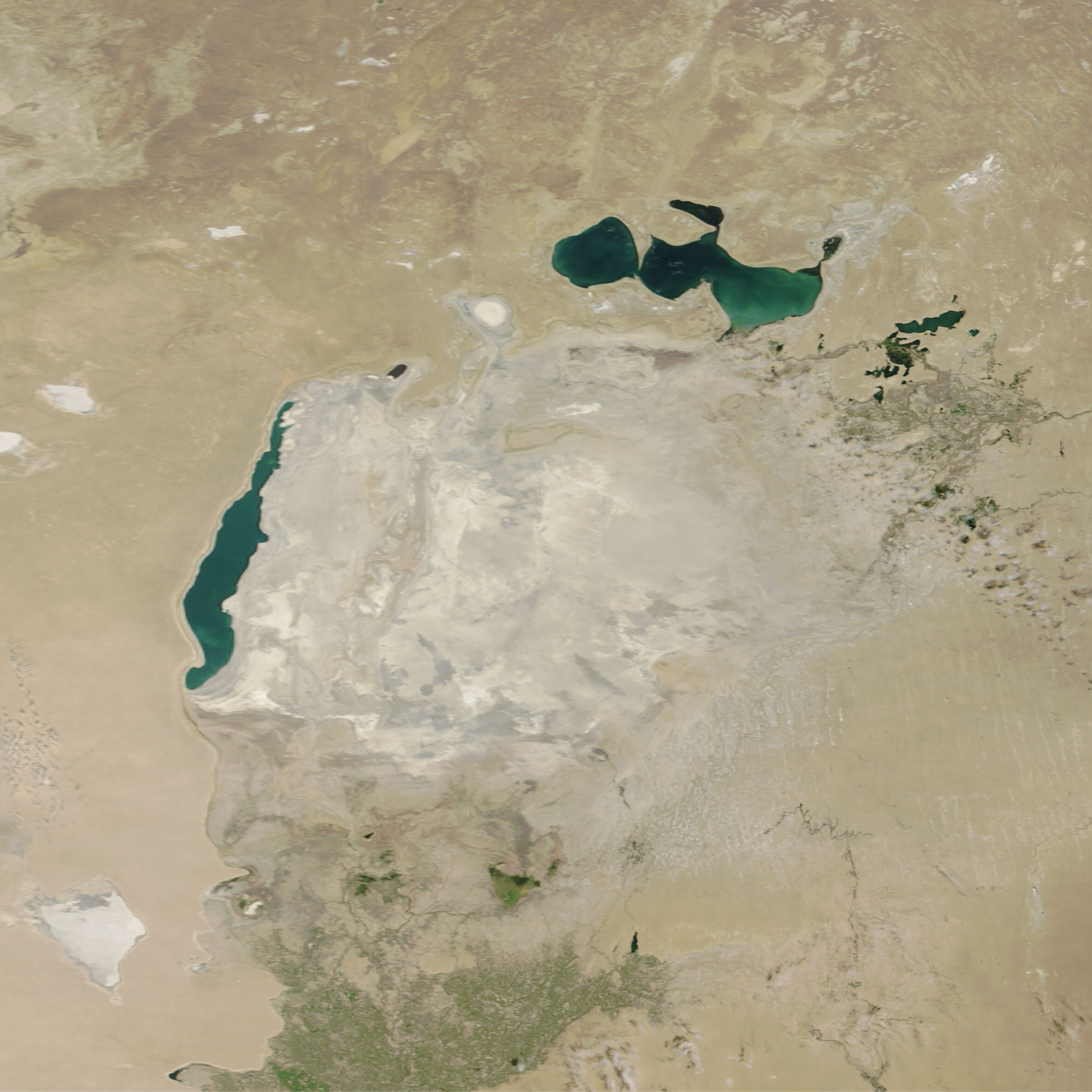
- Aralkum with the remaining areas of the Aral Sea in August 2026

- Animated map of the shrinking of the Aral Sea, and growing Aralkum

Geography
- Countries: Uzbekistan; Kazakhstan
- Coordinates: 45°00′N 60°30′E

The Aralkum Desert (Uzbek: Orolqum choʻli, Оролқум чўли, Kazakh: Аралқұм шөлі, Russian: Пустыня Аралкум) is a desert that has appeared since 1960 on the seabed once occupied by the Aral Sea. It lies to the south and east of what remains of the Eastern Basin Aral Sea in Uzbekistan and Kazakhstan. It is the youngest desert in the world.

== History ==
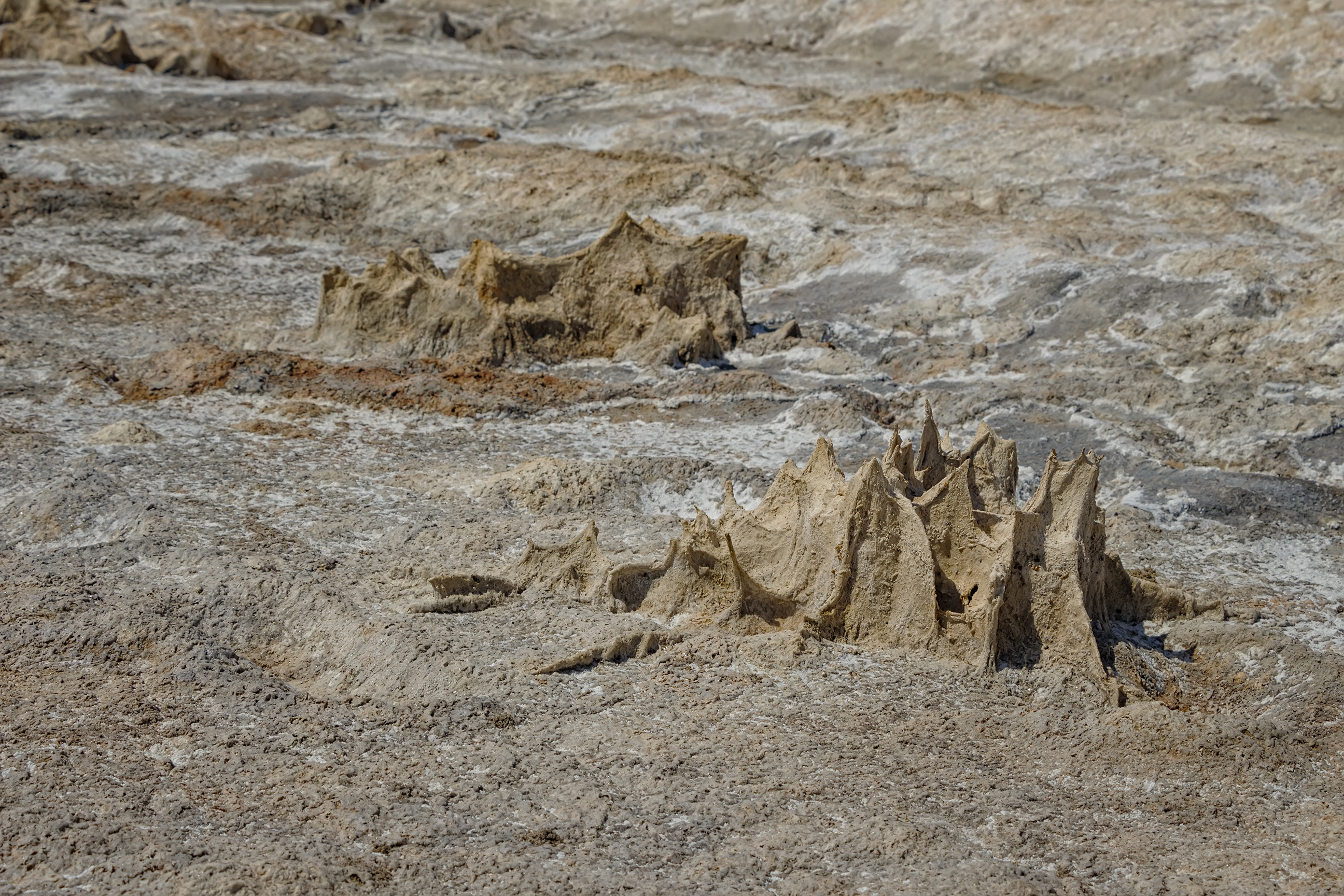
Salt structures in Aral Sea, Uzbekistan

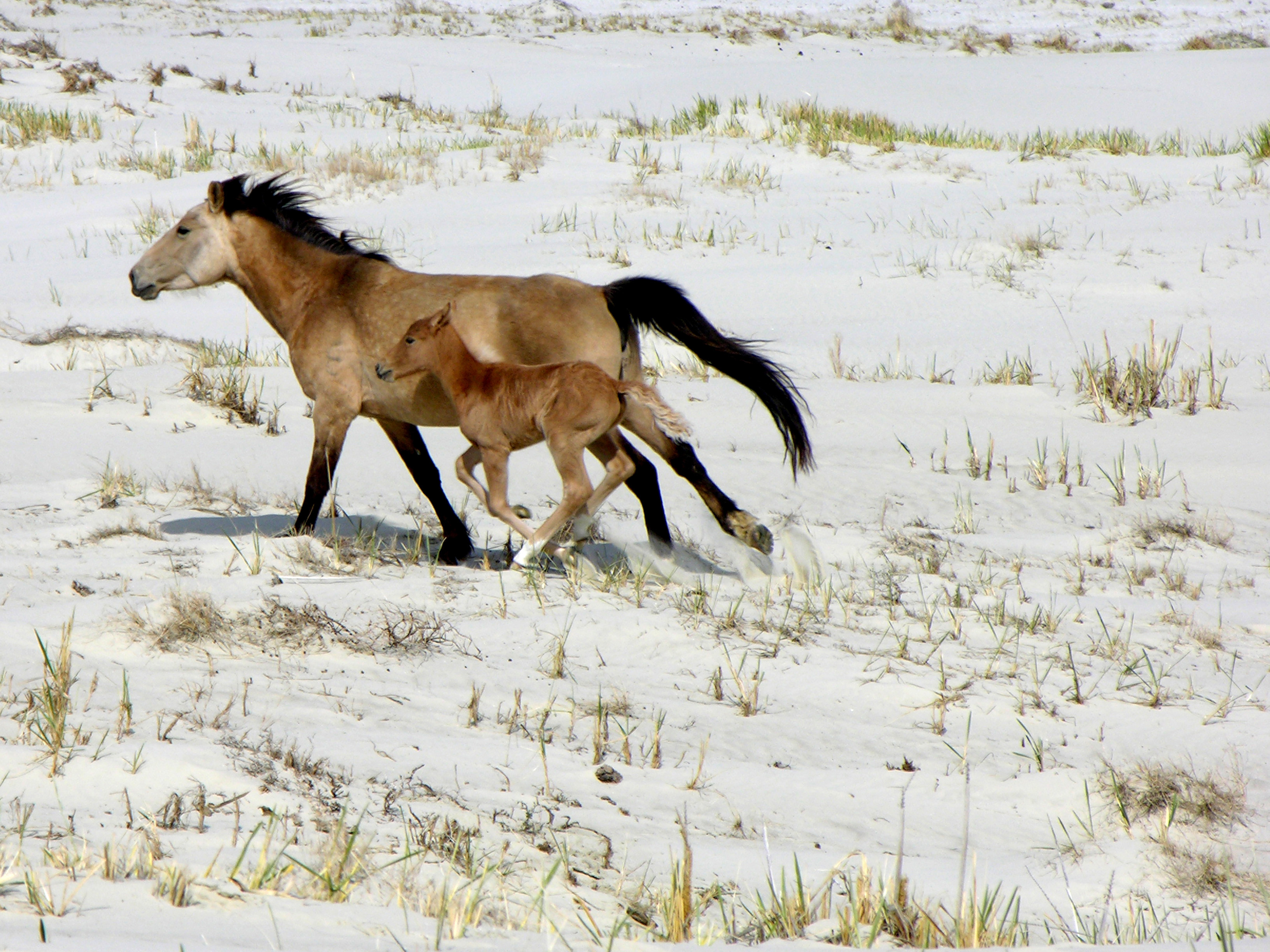
Ship Cemetery. Horse and foal, Kazakhstan

While the level of the Aral Sea has fluctuated over its existence, the most recent level drop since the 1960s was caused by the Soviet Union building massive irrigation projects in the region. The severely reduced inflow caused the water level in the Aral Sea to drop. While the North Aral Sea rose due to the Dike Kokaral, the South Aral Sea kept dropping, thus expanding the size of the desert, until 2010, when the South Aral Sea was partly reflooded. The water level of the South Aral Sea then began to drop again, this time more severely.

In August 2021, British polar athlete Rosie Stancer led the first expedition on foot across the Aralkum desert.

== Stranded boats ==
Before its desertification, the Aral Sea sustained a large fishing industry that provided up to one-sixth of the Soviet Union's fish. As the water receded, many fishing vessels and other boats were left behind in the desert. In the former port of the city of Moʻynoq, rusting vessels have become a tourist attraction and the site of the Stihia Festival, Central Asia's largest electronic music festival.

== Airborne contaminants ==
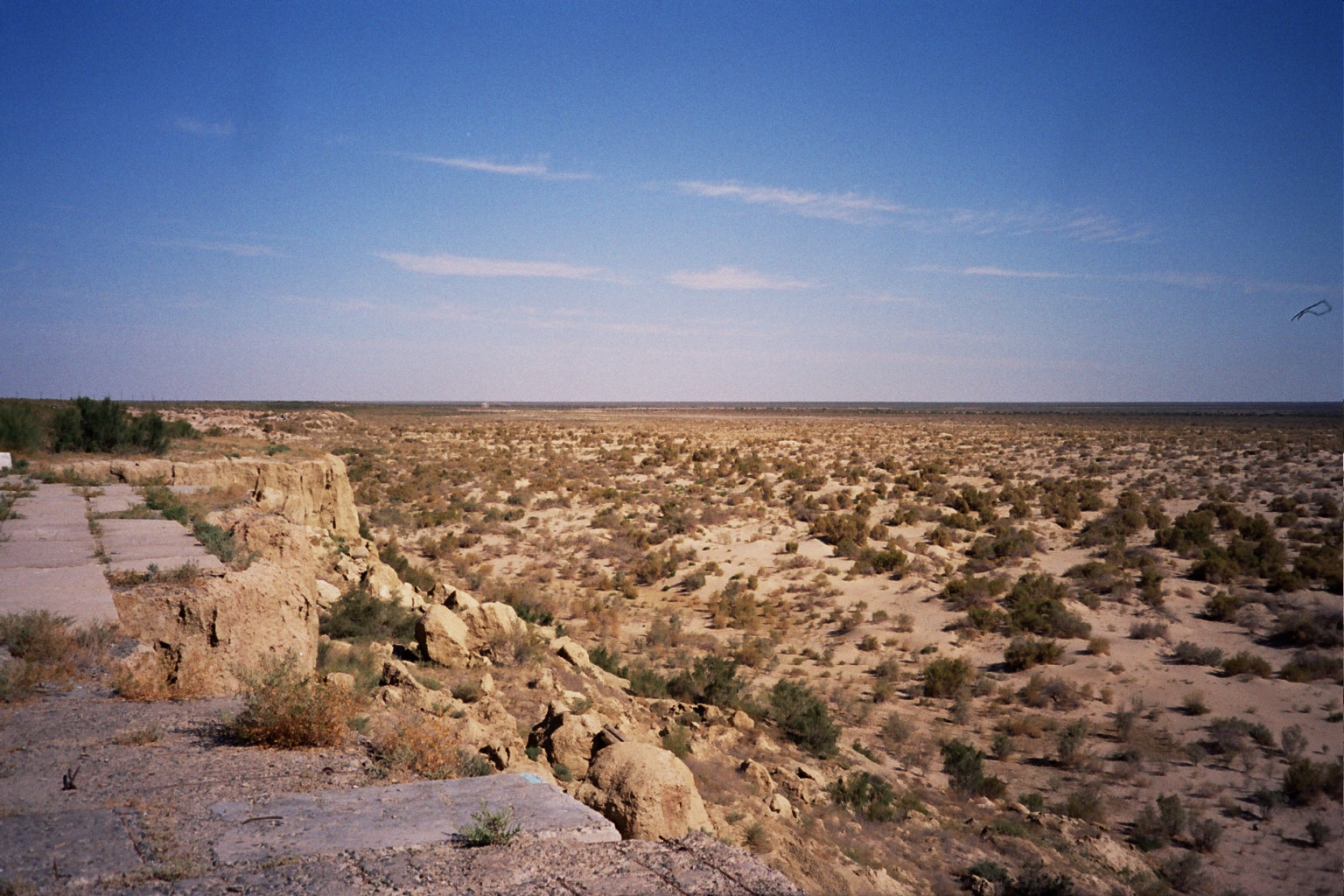
The bed of the former Aral Sea in Uzbekistan in 2004

The sands of the Aralkum and the dust that originates from it contain pollutants.

== See also ==
- Desertification
- List of environmental disasters
