= Tosbulak =

Village in Aktobe Region of Kazakhstan

Coordinates: 47°38′7″N 60°24′15″E

Tosbulak Тасбулак
- Interactive map of Tosbulak
- Country: Kazakhstan
- Region: Aktobe Region
- District: Shalkar District

Population (2011)
  - Total: 107

Tosbulak (Тасбулак), until 2005 known as Tusplok (Тусплок), is a small village in the Shalkar District of the Aktobe Region of Kazakhstan. Tusplok is in the south of the region. Tusplok's closest villages are Shendy, and Zhilan.
