= Bəyimli =

Bəyimli may refer to:

- Bəyimli, Agsu, Azerbaijan
- Bəyimli, Zardab, Azerbaijan
