= Tebez =

Lake in Kazakhstan

- Тебез
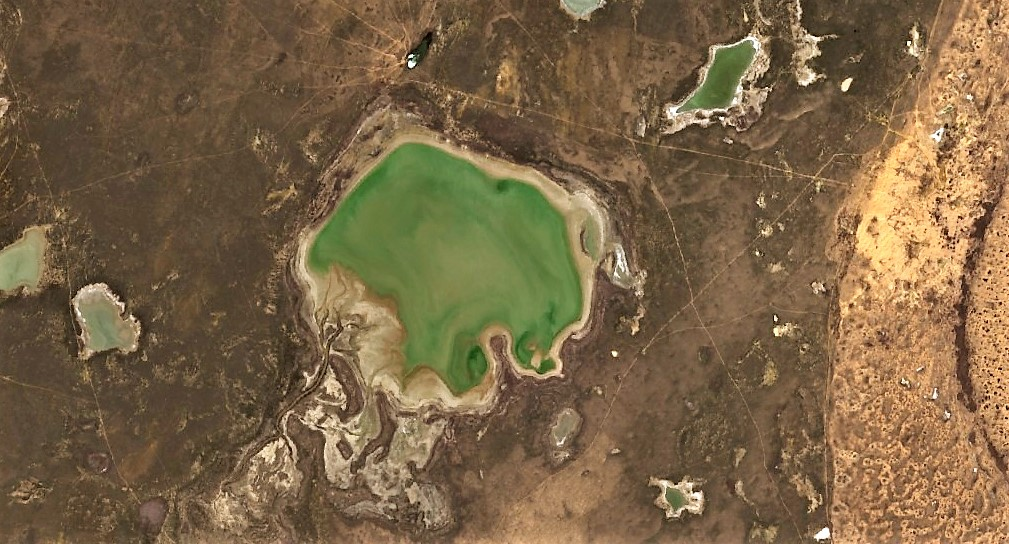
- Sentinel-2 picture of the lake

- Location within Kazakhstan
- Location: Shalkar Basin
- Coordinates: 48°12′31″N 59°40′42″E
- Type: endorheic lake
- Primary inflows: Bolgasyn
- Primary outflows: none
- Basin countries: Kazakhstan
- Max. length: 3.4 kilometers (2.1 mi)
- Max. width: 2.3 kilometers (1.4 mi)
- Surface area: 10 square kilometers (3.9 sq mi)
- Residence time: UTC+5:00
- Shore length^{1}: 13 kilometers (8.1 mi)
- Surface elevation: 167.6 meters (550 ft)
- Islands: none
- ^{1} Shore length is not a well-defined measure.

Tebez (Kazakh: Тебез) is a salt lake in Shalkar District, Aktobe Region, Kazakhstan.

The lake lies about 7 kilometers (4.3 mi) to the west of Taldykum village. The area near the lakeshore is used as a grazing ground for local cattle. In the spring the lake water is usually suitable for the cattle to drink.

== Geography ==
Tebez is an endorheic lake of the Shalkar Basin. It is located at an elevation of 167 meters (548 ft). Lake Karakol lies 12 kilometers (7.5 mi) to the southwest and Zhamantuz 22 kilometers (14 mi) to the SSW of the lake.

Tebez is 3.4 kilometers (2.1 mi) long and 2 kilometers (1.2 mi) wide. The shores are wide and flat. The Bolgasyn river flows from the west into the southwestern lakeshore, replenishing the lake in the spring. The water of the lake is salty and bitter, its salinity increasing by the end of the summer.

== Flora and fauna ==
Halophyte grasses grow near the shores and steppe vegetation in the surrounding area.

== See also ==
- List of lakes of Kazakhstan
