= Barsakelmes Lake =

Lake in the former Aral Sea

- Барсакелмес көлі (Kazakh)
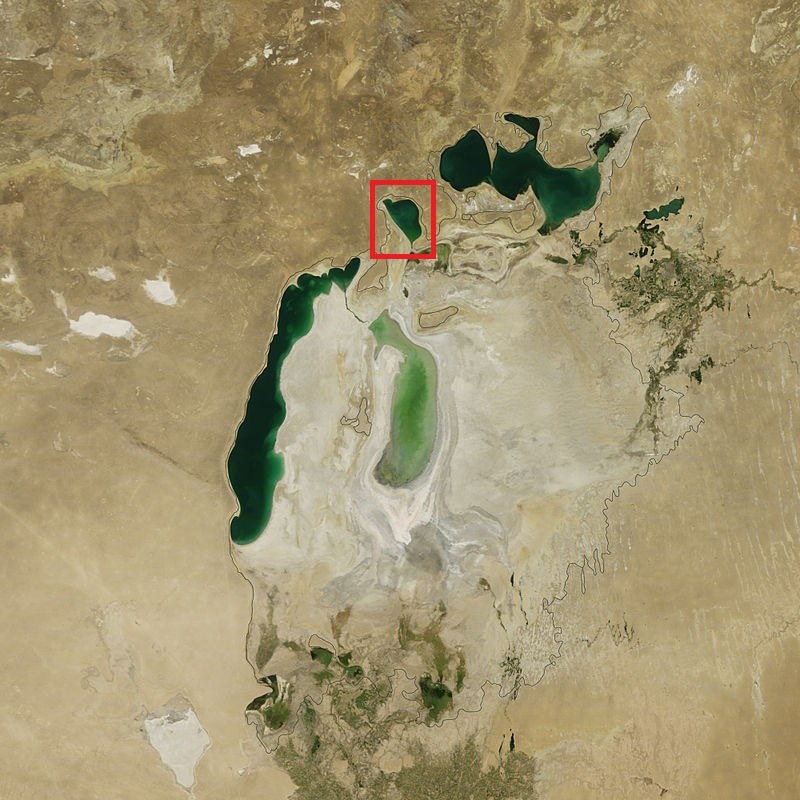
- Interactive map of Barsakelmes Lake
- Location: Kyzylorda Region, Kazakhstan
- Coordinates: 46.23°N 59.69°E
- Type: Endorheic, saline, intermittent lake
- Primary inflows: North Aral Sea
- Basin countries: Kazakhstan
- Surface area: 0 km^{2} (0 sq mi)
- Average depth: 0 m (0 ft)
- Water volume: 0 km^{3} (2026)
- Islands: 0

Barsakelmes Lake is a small, intermittent saline lake located between the Northern and Western Seas of the former unified Aral Sea. It is the last remainder of the Eastern basin of the former South Aral Sea.

== Etymology ==
Barsakelmes Lake's namesake, Barsa-Kelmes (Kazakh: Барсакелмес), was a major island of the old Aral Sea, once located to the south of the present lake. By itself, the name translates to "if (someone) goes, (they) don't return", or more idiomatically, "the place of no return."

Before separation from the Aral Sea, what is today Barsakelmes Lake was known as Tschebas Bay (Kazakh: Тұщыбас, romanized: Tūshybas, lit. 'fresh(water) source'). Although ironic due to the lake's present condition, Tschebas Bay was named due to the presence of freshwater springs and underground freshwater inflow from the Ustyurt plateau.

== History ==
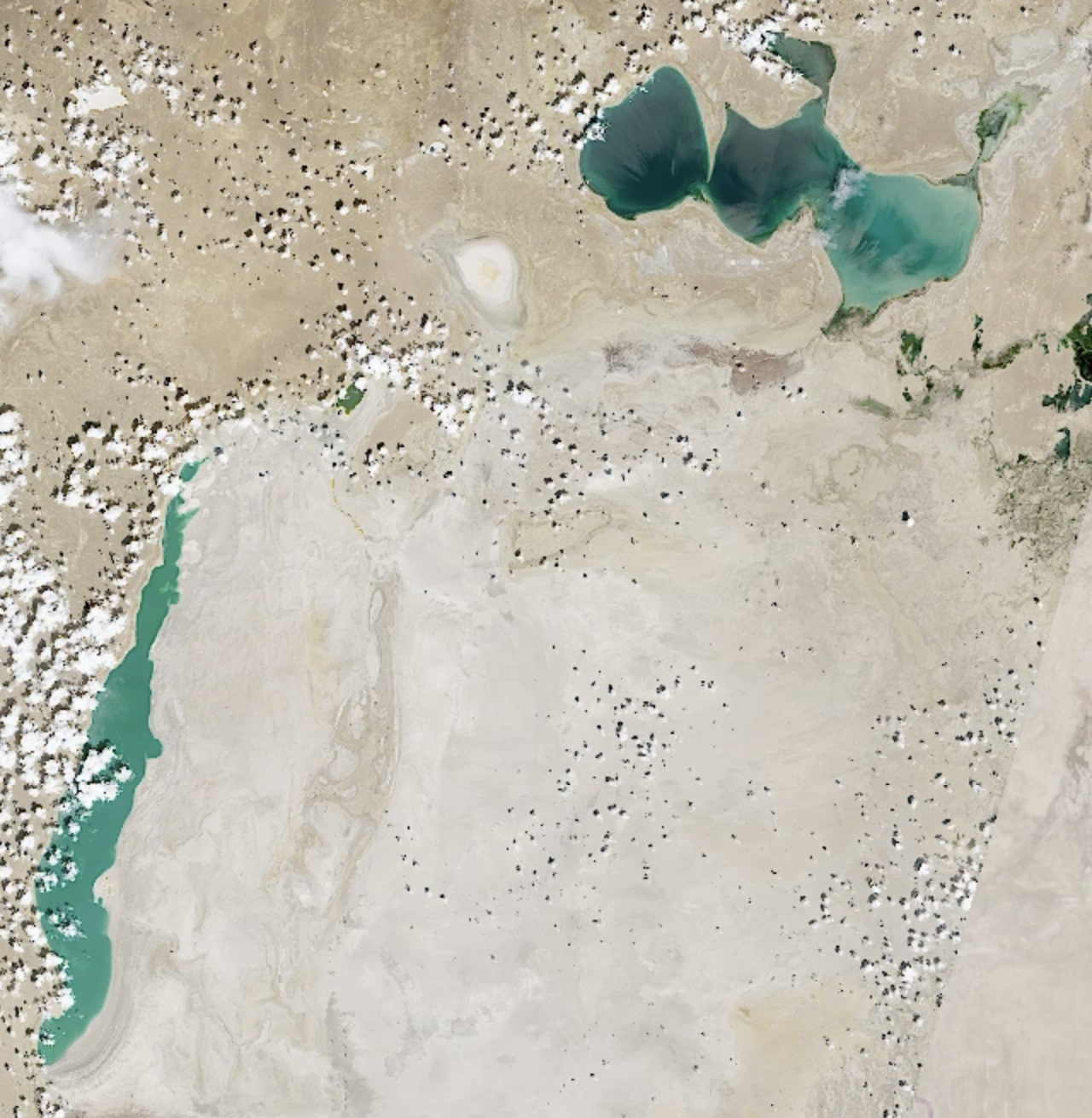
The dried Barsakelmes Lake in mid-June 2026.

Around the early 2010s, the lake split from the South Aral Sea. It is occasionally fed by the North Aral Sea after heavy rain or snowmelt.

By November 2025, the lakebed completely dried out for the first time ever since the Barsakelmes split from the Aral Sea. However, due to precipitation in mid-December of the same year, some water was restored.

In mid-May 2026, the lakebed once again became fully dry.

== See also ==
- Barsa-Kelmes
- Aralkum Desert
