= Bolgasyn =

River in Kazakhstan

Bolgasyn Болғасын
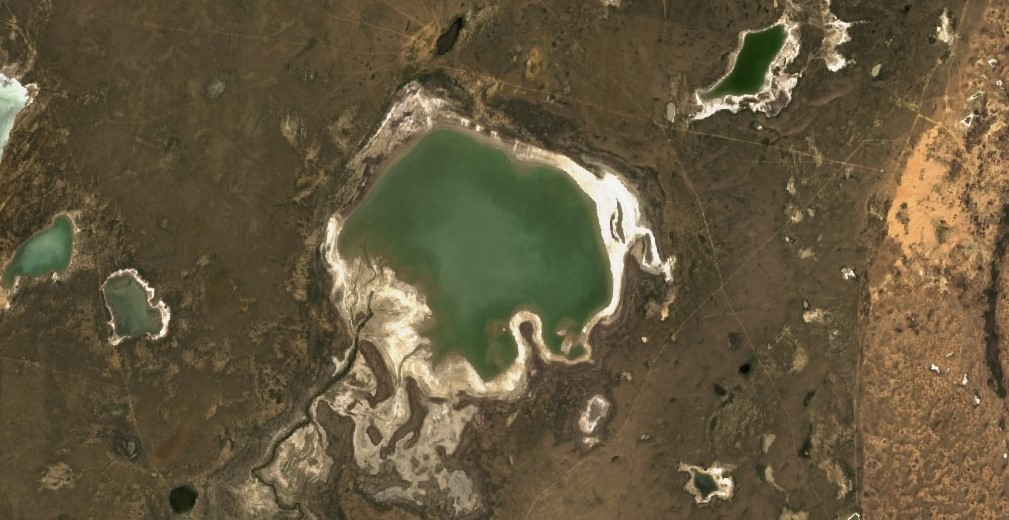
- Final stretch of river Bolgasyn and its mouth in lake Tebez Sentinel-2 image.

- Mouth location in Kazakhstan

Location
- Countries: Kazakhstan

Physical characteristics
- Source: Mugalzhar
  - coordinates: 48°22′22″N 59°04′40″E
- Mouth: Tebez
  - coordinates: 48°11′56″N 59°39′43″E
  - elevation: 167 m (548 ft)
- Length: 73 km (45 mi)
- Basin size: 1,670 km^{2} (640 sq mi)
- Discharge
  - average: 0.5 m^{3}/s (18 cu ft/s)

The Bolgasyn (Kazakh: Болғасын) is a river in Shalkar District, Aktobe Region, Kazakhstan. It is 73 kilometres (45 mi) long and has a catchment area of 1,670 square kilometres (640 sq mi).

The river is part of the Shalkar Basin. In the spring the Bolgasyn is used to water local livestock.

== Course ==
The Bolgasyn has its sources in the Shagyray Plateau, part of the southern sector of the Mugalzhar Hills. It heads first southeastwards, parallel to the upper course of the Kauylzhyr river that flows a little to the south, to the northwest of lake Shalkar. In its middle course the river bends eastwards and in its final stretch it bends northeastwards, entering lake Tebez from the southwest.

The Bolgasyn usually reaches its highest level for a few weeks in March and April when the snows melt. By May it splits into separate ponds and then dries up completely even before the summer. Its floodplain has 38 small tributaries with a total length of 10 km (6.2 mi).

== See also ==
- List of rivers of Kazakhstan
