= Karashokat =

Karashokat Карашокат
- Village
- Location in Kazakhstan
- Coordinates: 47°24′47″N 60°50′40″E
- Country: Kazakhstan
- Region: Aktobe Region
- District: Shalkar District
- Time zone: UTC+5 (Central Asia Time)

Karashokat (Kazakh: Карашокат) is a village in the Shalkar District, Aktobe Region, Kazakhstan. It is part of the Kishikum Rural District (KATO code - 156442300). Population: 267 (2009 census results); 114 (1999 census results).

== Geography ==
The village is located near the northern end of the Lesser Barsuki Desert.
