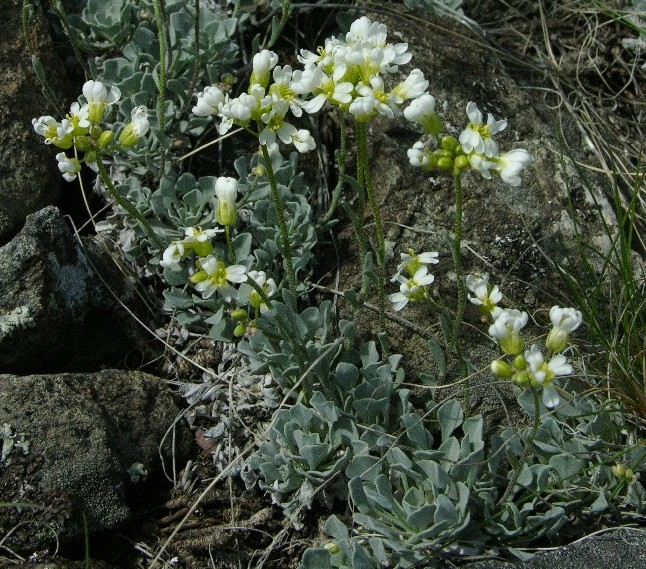
- Galitzkya spathulata in Mugodzhary

Scientific classification
- Kingdom: Plantae
- Clade: Tracheophytes
- Clade: Angiosperms
- Clade: Eudicots
- Clade: Rosids
- Order: Brassicales
- Family: Brassicaceae
- Genus: Galitzkya; V.V.Botschantz.

= Galitzkya =

Genus of flowering plants

Galitzkya is a genus of 3 species of flowering plants of family Brassicaceae, according to Appel, O. & Al-Shehbaz, I. 2003.

Named after Nikolai Petrovic Ikonnikov-Galitzky (1892—1942), Russian botanist.

Three species are accepted.

- Galitzkya macrocarpa (Ikonn.-Gal.) V.V.Botschantz.
- Galitzkya potaninii (Maxim.) V.V.Botschantz.
- Galitzkya spathulata (Stephan ex Willd.) V.V.Botschantz.
