= Kokaral =

Coordinates: 46°14′30″N 60°44′10″E

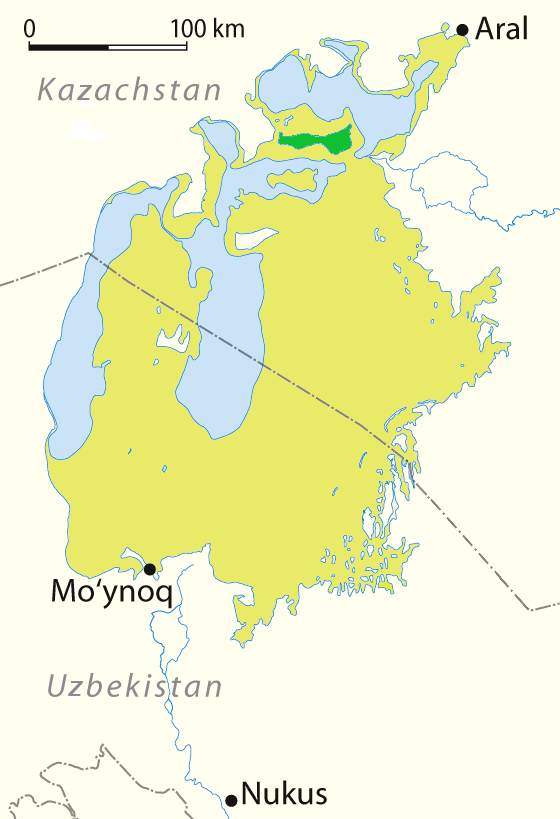
Kokaral Island on the map of Aral sea

Kokaral (Kazakh: Көкарал, Kökaral meaning Green Island) was until 1973 an island in Kazakhstan, in the northern part of the Aral Sea. It had an area of 273 km^{2} (1960), and its highest point was the 163 meter high hill called Daut. On its northern shore were situated the fishing villages of Kokaral, Avan and Akbasty.

Due to the shrinking of the Aral Sea, the island became connected to the mainland in the 1960s at its western end, and became the Kokaral Peninsula. From 1987 on it became connected to the surrounding land also at its eastern end, over the Berg Strait, turning the peninsula into an isthmus separating the North Aral Sea and the South Aral Sea.

In 2005 the Dike Kokaral across the Berg Strait was completed. The dike stops water from the North Aral Sea from spilling over into the South Aral Sea, and thus contributes to maintaining and increasing the water level in the northern sea. Since then, the water level of the North Aral Sea has risen.
