= Guberlin Mountains =

Mountain range in Russia

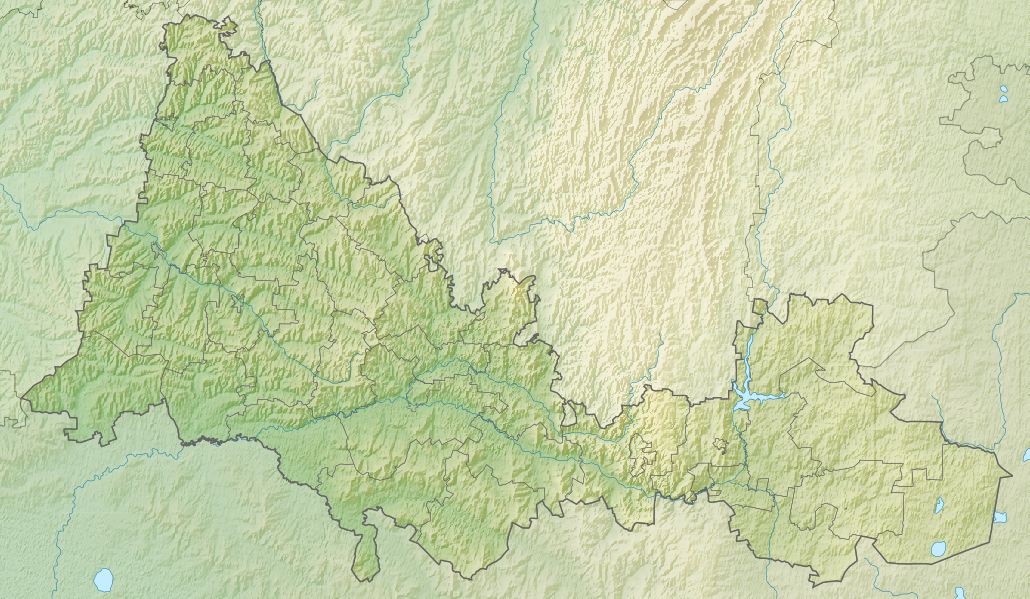
- Location within Orenburg Oblast Location within Kazakhstan Location within European Russia

Highest point
- Parent peak: Transverse (mountain)
- Coordinates: 51°20′N 58°21′E

Geography
- Location: Orenburg Oblast

Guberlinsky mountains (Russian: Губерлинские горы) is a mountain range in the east Orenburg Oblast, in the basin of river Guberlya (right tributary of Ural). Southern part of Ural Mountains.

The Guberlinsky Mountains extend from north to south for 70 kilometres (43 mi). Their area is about 400 square kilometres (150 sq mi). The mountains are heavily indented by the valley of Guberlya and by the ravines and gullies of its tributaries. The depth of some gorges reaches 80–100 metres (260–330 ft). The prevailing heights are 300–350 metres (980–1,150 ft). The highest peak is mountain Poperechnaya. In the southern part, the Guberlin Mountains turn into Mugodzhar Hills.

The mountains are mainly composed of tufa, siliceous and clayey slate. steppe vegetation grows on the slopes, there are mosses and lichen and. Within the mountains there are deposits of manganese, copper, iron and nickel ores (Akkerman nickel mine), chromium a, limestone and others minerals
