= Akespe =

Akespe Ақеспе
- Village
- Location in Kazakhstan
- Coordinates: 46°47′01″N 60°30′18″E
- Country: Kazakhstan
- Region: Kyzylorda Region
- District: Aral District

Population (2009)
  - Total: 255
- Time zone: UTC+5 (Central Asia Time)

Akespe (Kazakh: Ақеспе) is a village in the Aral District, Kyzylorda Region, Kazakhstan. It is part of the Kosaman Rural District (KATO code - 433246200). Population: 255 (2009 census results); 200 (1999 census results).

In 1925, a large site containing numerous fossils of the Oligocene was discovered near Akespe by the Aral Sea shore.

== History ==
Human settlement that was dated back to the Neolithic era, 4th-3rd century BC proves human presence in the area in Antiquity.

== Geography ==
The village is located by the Butakov Bay of the North Aral Sea, near the southern end of the Lesser Barsuki Desert.
