= Or (river) =

- Mouth location in Russia

Location
- Country: Russia, Kazakhstan

Physical characteristics
- Mouth: Ural
  - location: Orsk
  - coordinates: 51.1856°N 58.5411°E
- Length: 332 km (206 mi)
- Basin size: 18,600 km^{2} (7,200 sq mi)

Basin features
- Progression: Ural→ Caspian Sea

The Or (Russian: Орь, Kazakh: Ор) is a river in Orenburg Oblast of Russia and Aktobe Province of Kazakhstan. It is a left tributary of the Ural, and is 332 km long, with a drainage basin of 18 600 km^{2}. The river is formed by the confluence of the rivers Shiyli and Terisbutak, which have their sources on the western slopes of the Mugodzhar Hills, and it joins the Ural by the city of Orsk. Most of its discharge are from melting snow. The average discharge, 61 km from its mouth, is 21.3 m^{3}/sek. The spring flooding lasts from April to mid-May. The rest of the year the water level is very low. The river freezes in late October and is icebound until March – April. The river is used for irrigation and water supply.
