= Bəyimli, Zardab =

Bəyimli
- Municipality
- Location within Azerbaijan
- Coordinates: 40°15′21″N 47°49′25″E
- Country: Azerbaijan
- Rayon: Zardab

Population (2008)
  - Total: 830
- Time zone: UTC+4 (AZT)
  - Summer (DST): UTC+5 (AZT)

Bəyimli (also, Begimli) is a village and municipality in the Zardab Rayon of Azerbaijan. It has a population of 830.
