= South Aral Sea =

Dried lake

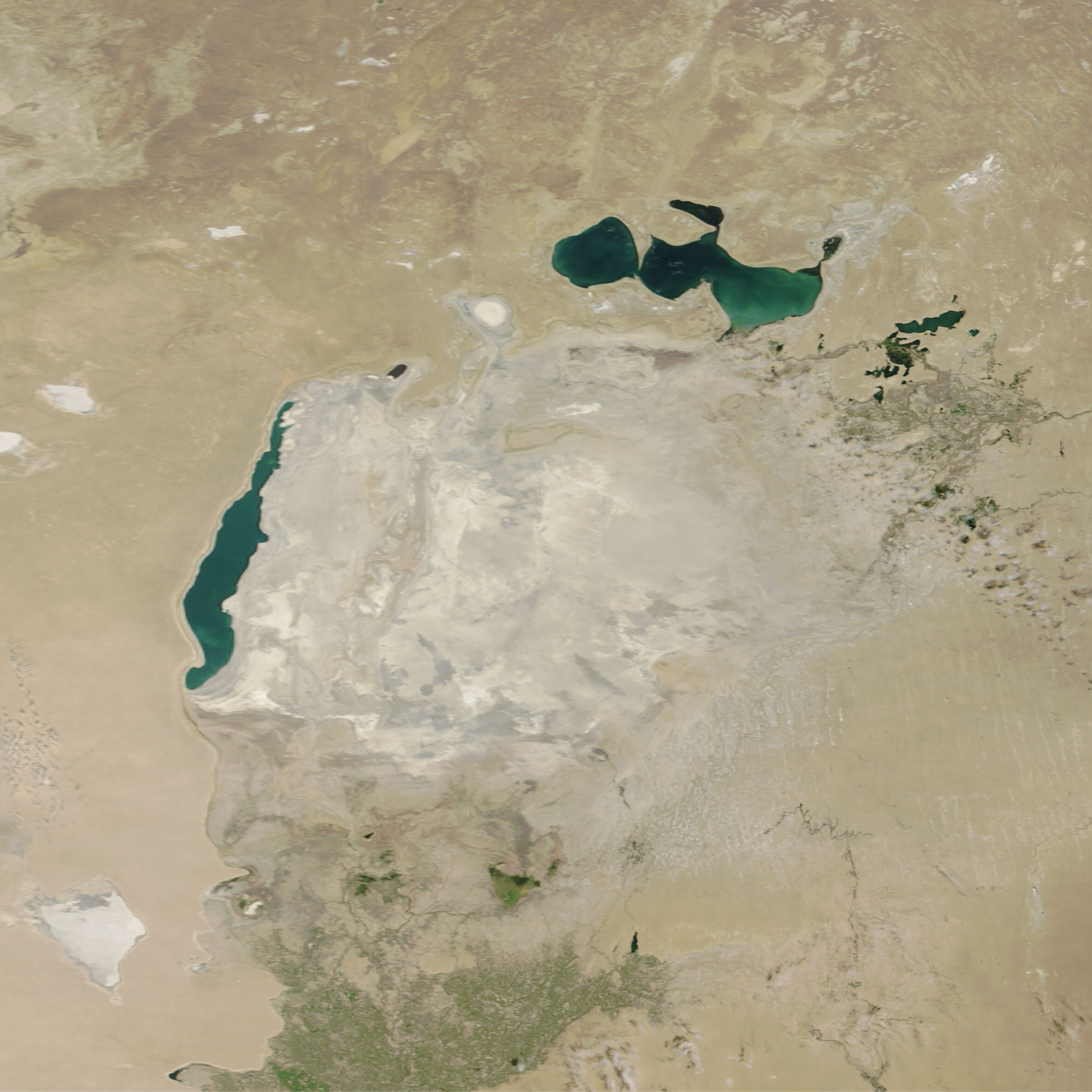
- The Aral Sea in August 2026. The strip of water to the west is the remainder of the South Aral Sea.

- Location within Kazakhstan Location within West and Central Asia Location within Asia
- Location: Kazakhstan–Uzbekistan, Central Asia
- Coordinates: 45°N 58.5°E
- Type: endorheic, natural lake, saline
- Primary inflows: groundwater only (previously the Amu Darya)
- Basin countries: Kazakhstan, Uzbekistan
- Surface area: West Aral Sea: 3,500 km^{2} (1,350 mi^{2}) (2005) (fluctuating area of Eastern Sea); 42,100 km^{2} (16,250 mi^{2}) (1989)
- Average depth: 14–15 m (46–49 ft) (2005)
- Max. depth: 37–40 m (121–131 ft) (2005)
- Surface elevation: 29 m (95 ft) (2007)

The South Aral Sea is a lake in the basin of the former Aral Sea that formed in 1987 when that body divided in two, due to diversion of river inflow for agriculture. In 2003, the South Aral Sea itself split into eastern and western basins, the Eastern Sea and the West Aral Sea, connected by a narrow channel (channel bed at an elevation of 29 m (95 ft)) that balanced surface levels but did not allow mixing, and in 2005 the North Aral Sea was dammed to prevent the collapse of its fisheries, cutting off the only remaining inflow to the southern lakes. In 2008, the Eastern Sea split again, and in May 2009 had almost completely dried out, leaving only the small, intermittent Barsakelmes Lake between the Northern and Western Seas and increasing the expanse of the Aralkum desert. In 2010, it was partially filled again by meltwater, and by 2014 was once again dry. The West Aral Sea has some replenishment from groundwater in the northwest from the Ustyurt plateau.

== History ==
The Aral Sea began shrinking in the 1960s, when the Soviet Union decided that the two rivers feeding it, the Amu Darya and the Syr Darya, would be diverted in order to irrigate cotton and food crops in Kazakhstan and Uzbekistan. In 1987, due to an accelerated loss of water, the Aral Sea was split into northern and southern parts; the northern part is the current North Aral Sea.

== Salinity ==
In 2007, the western basin had a salinity of 70 g/L and the eastern basin 100 g/L. Once the water level falls below the connecting channel (elevation 29 m), the salinities can be expected to diverge further. Under current conditions, the eastern basin may receive water from the Amu Darya in wet years, fluctuating in salinity and flooding an area of up to 4500 km^{2} in salt water to a depth of about one meter, which would preclude any economic activity in the area, while the western basin becomes increasingly saline. Water diversion from the Amu Darya directly to the deeper western basin could lower its salinity enough to allow resumption of local fisheries, while allowing the eastern basin to desiccate almost entirely and avoiding the problems of flooding.

== Current situation ==
The West Aral Sea is expected to stabilize at 2,700–3,500 km^{2} (1,040–1,350 mi^{2}), a mean depth of 14–15 m (46–49 ft), and a maximum depth of 37–40 m (121–131 ft), assuming groundwater discharge at the rate of 2 km^{3} (0.5 mi^{3}) per year. The Eastern Sea dried up completely in the summer of 2009, apart from the small (now intermittent) Barsakelmes Lake between the Northern and Western seas. However, it received some water from snow melt in the spring of 2010. It is expected to alternate between complete desiccation in the summers and the occasional flood from the Amu Darya or spillover from the Kokaral Dam. Plans for a second dike, though, may reduce the incidence of the latter.

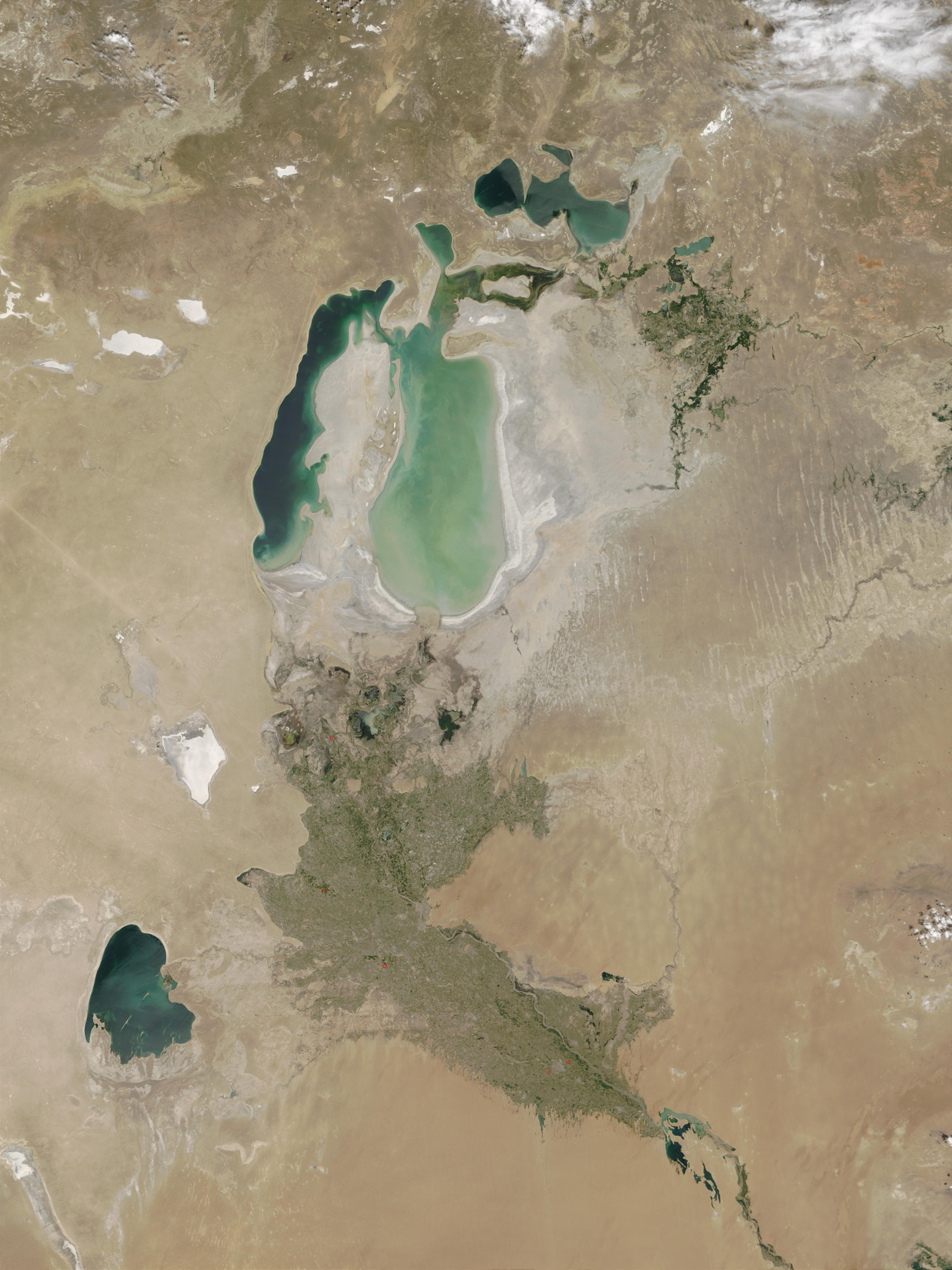
July 2002 – The sea's former bed is visible as lighter-colored areas, the lightest regions representing the most recent retreat.

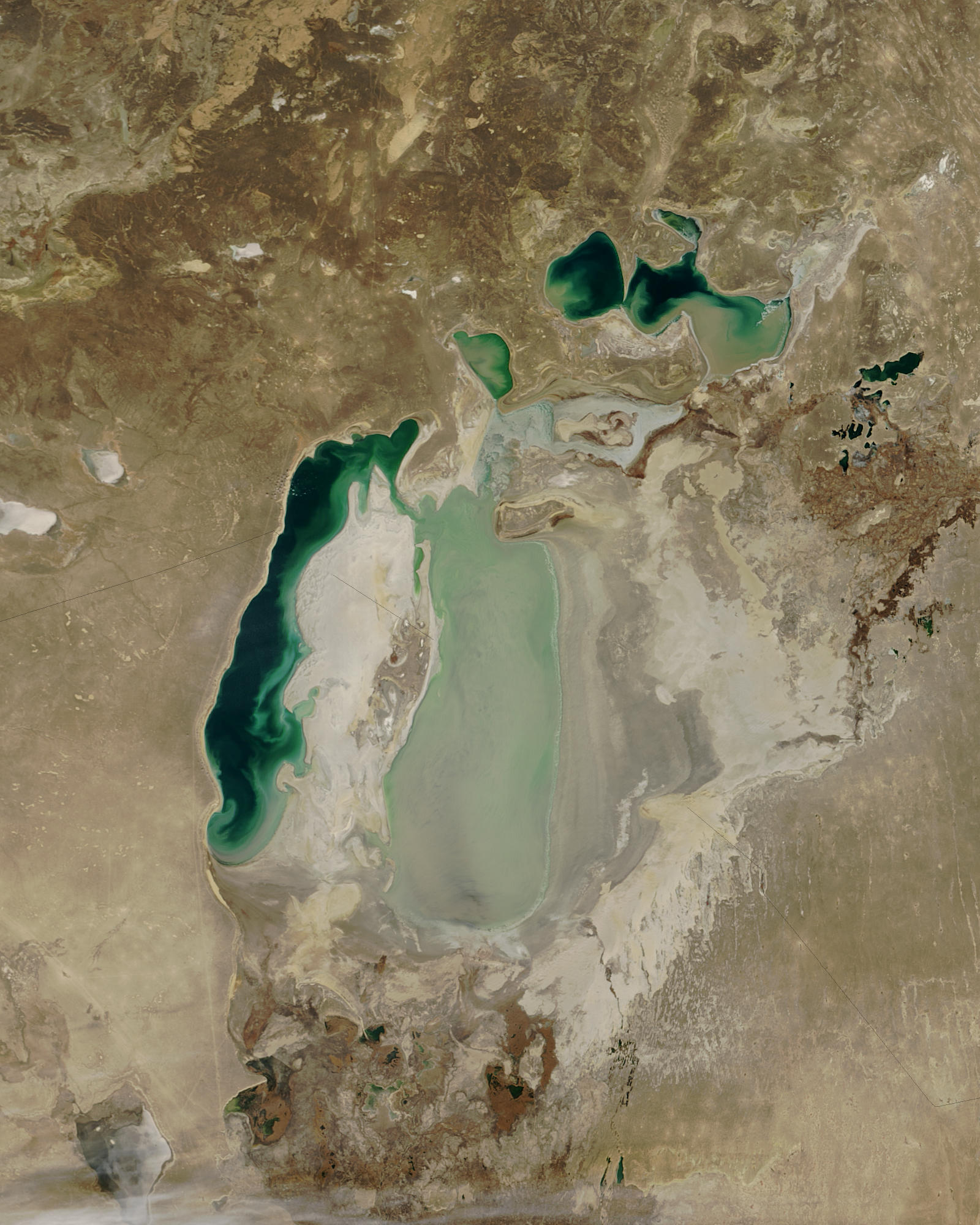
November 2003 – Much of the Eastern Sea's water has evaporated, the jade green swirls representing sediment in the shallow water.

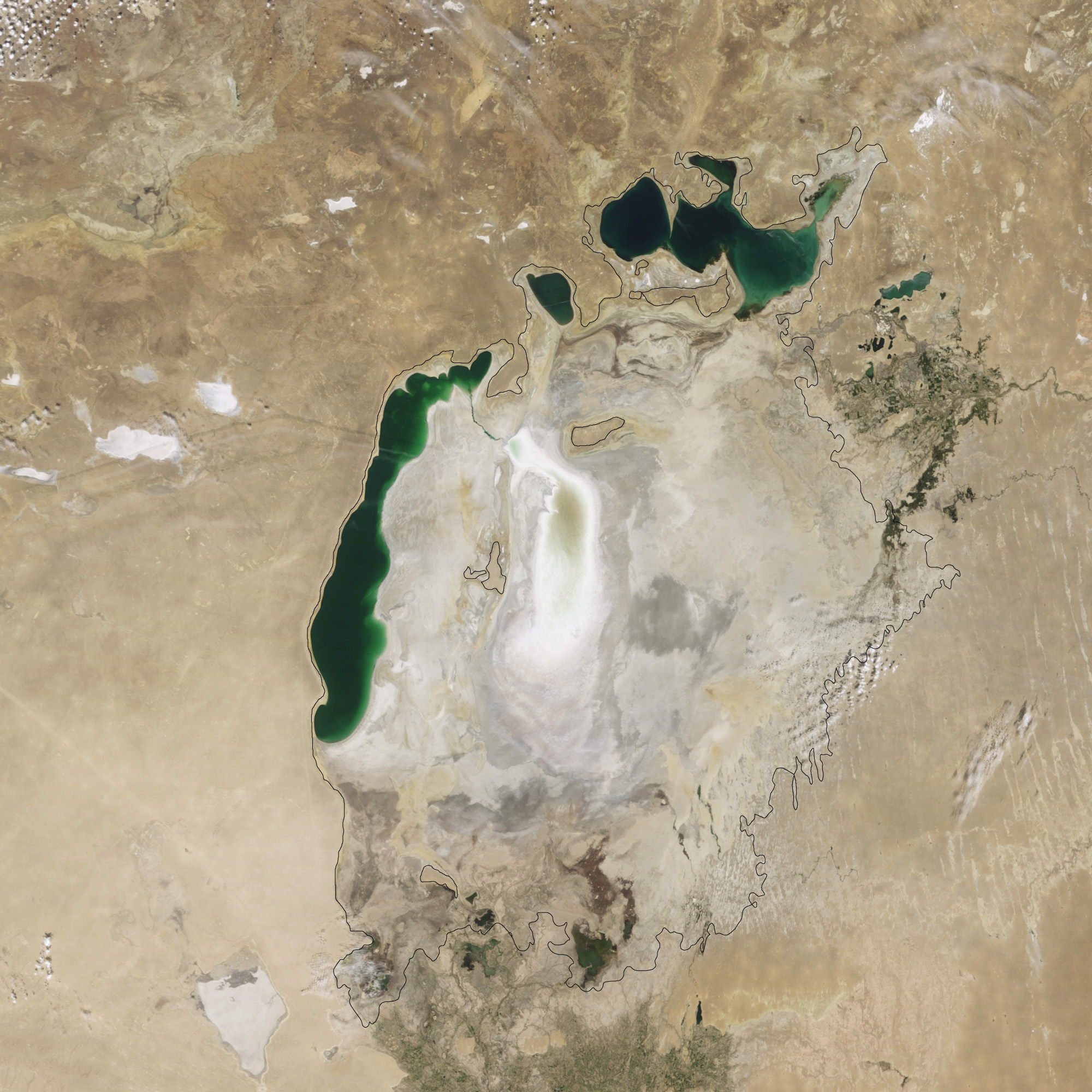
August 2009 – The Eastern Sea's mud flats have dried further, with only the faintest glimmer of water where it drains into the Western Sea. Barsakelmes Lake appears between the Northern and Western seas.

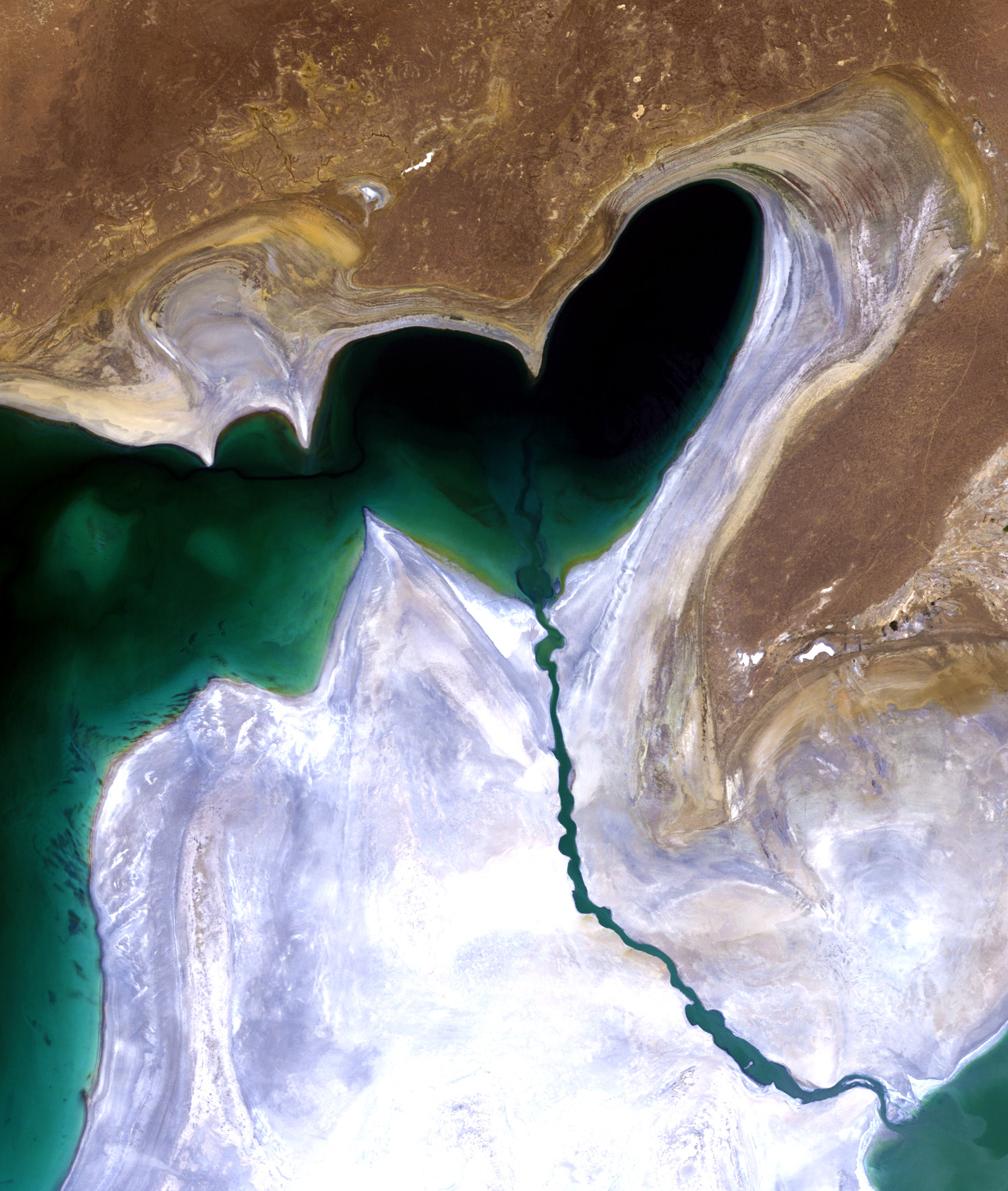
July 2010 – A closeup of the channel leading from the re-flooded Eastern Sea to the Western Sea. The white areas are the exposed salt flats of the new Aralkum desert.

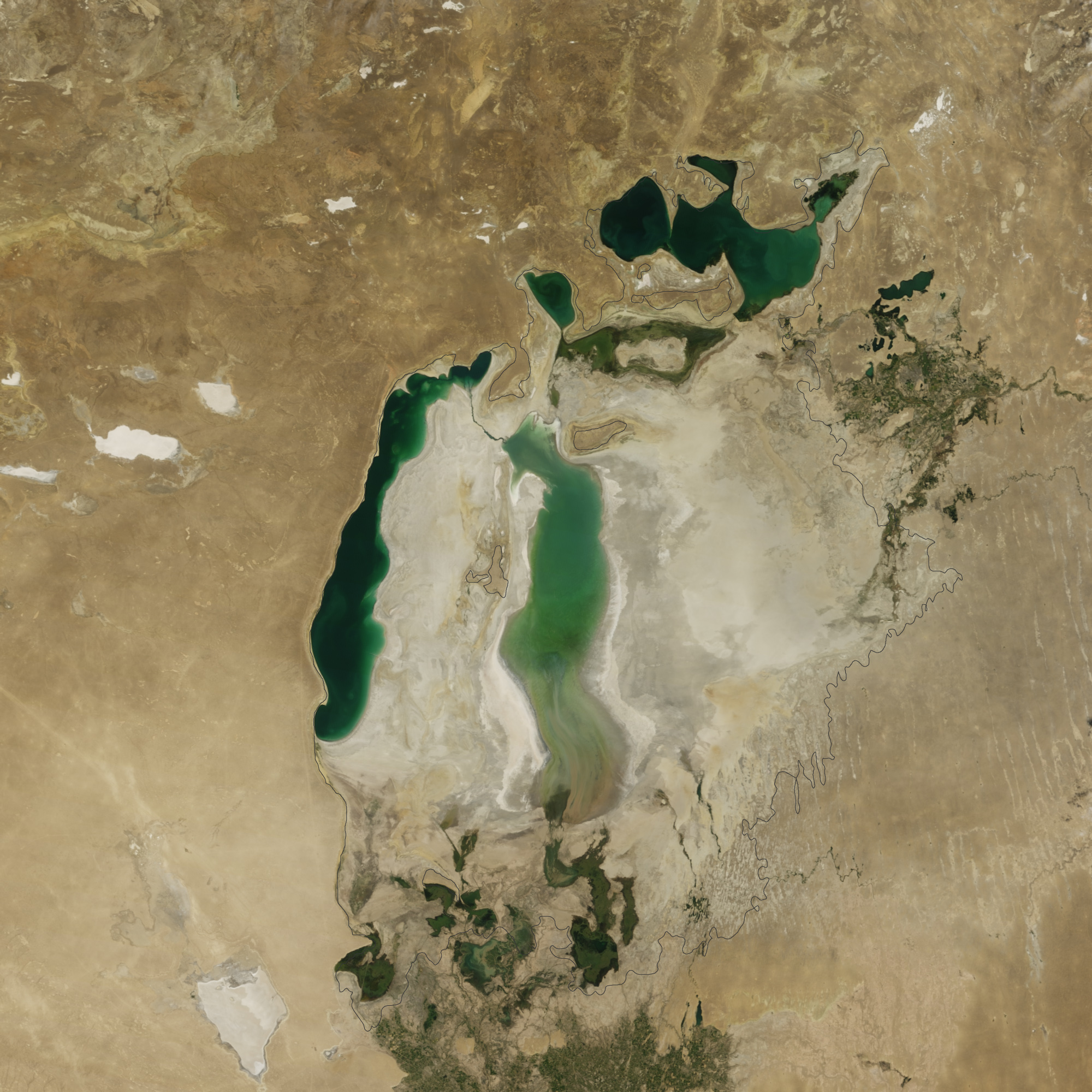
August 2010 – Part of the Eastern Sea has been re-flooded by the Amu Darya from heavy snowmelt.

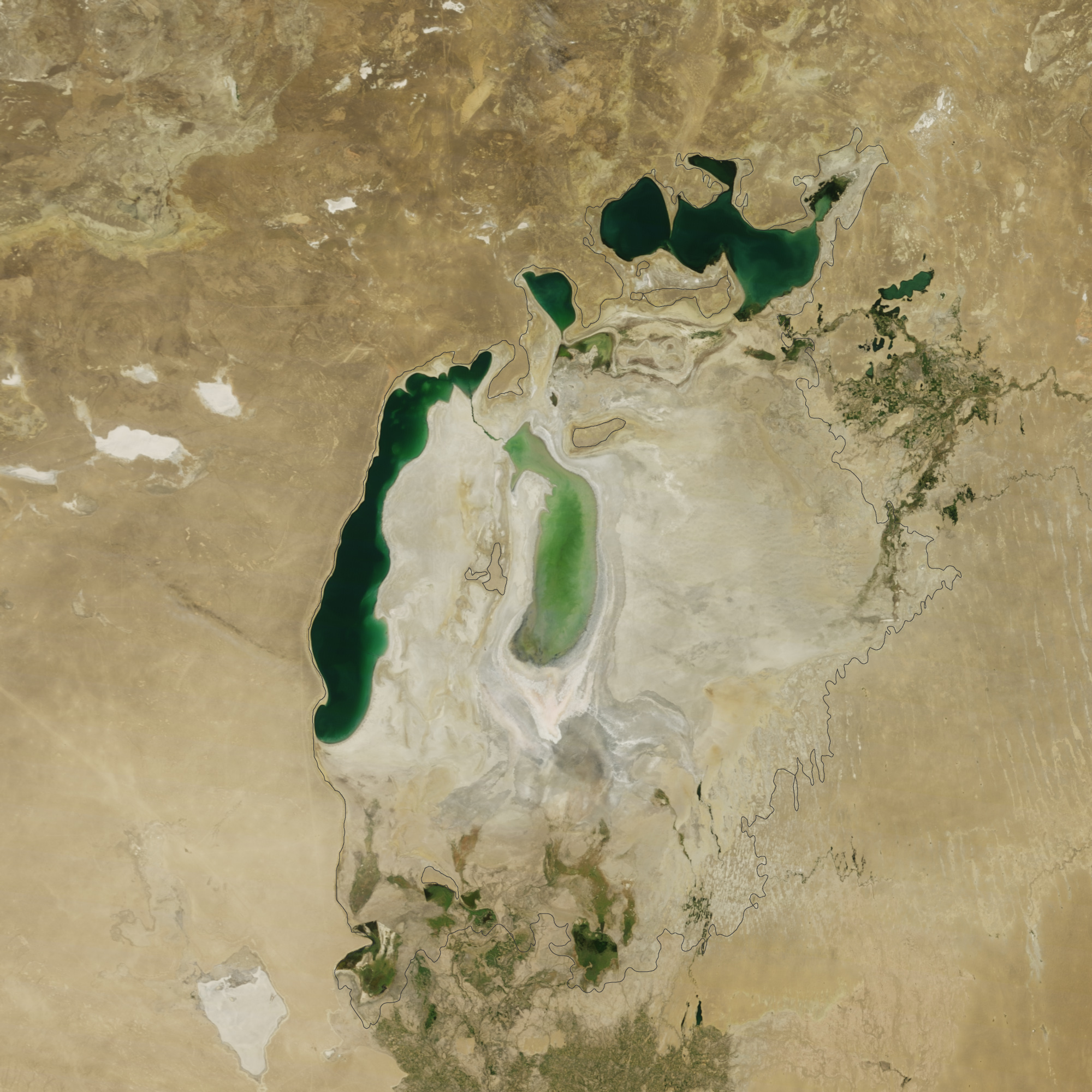
September 2011 – The Northern Sea and Eastern Sea lost water, while the Western Sea gained more water.

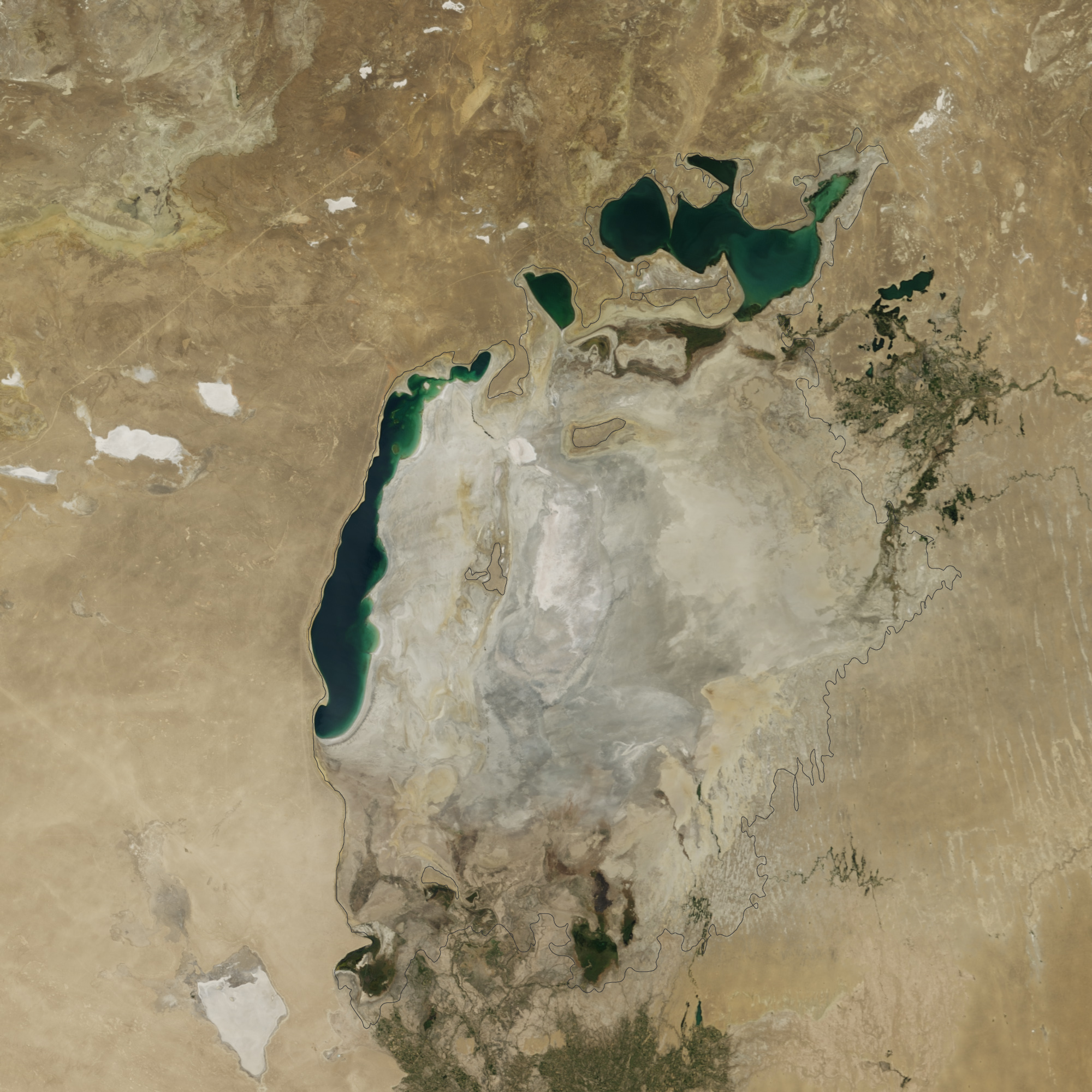
August 2014 – The Aral Sea completely loses its Eastern Lobe.

In 2015, the Western Sea was starting to split into two, as the channel that connects the central part of the sea and the small North-Eastern part was growing skinnier, as can be shown in the 2014 image. Since 2018, the split has been complete.
