= Kauylzhyr =

River in Kazakhstan

Kauylzhyr Қауылжыр
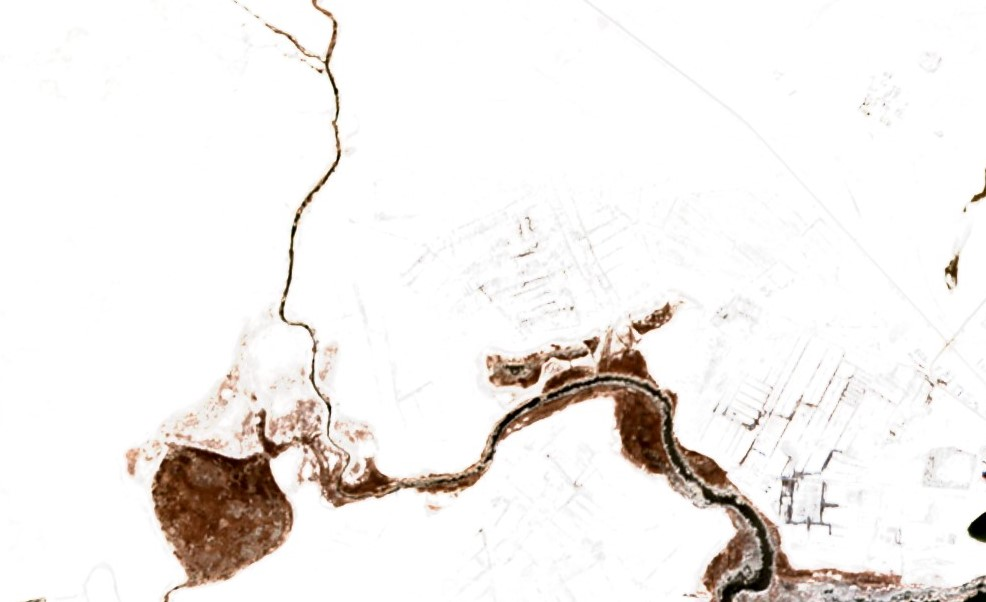
- Final stretch of river Kauylzhyr and its mouth in lake Shalkar in the winter Sentinel-2 image.

- Mouth location in Kazakhstan

Location
- Countries: Kazakhstan

Physical characteristics
- Source: Mugalzhar
  - coordinates: 48°33′11″N 58°36′01″E
- Mouth: Shalkar
  - coordinates: 47°51′02″N 59°32′16″E
- Length: 142 km (88 mi)
- Basin size: 1,810 km^{2} (700 sq mi)

The Kauylzhyr (Kazakh: Қауылжыр; Russian: Каульжур) is a river in Shalkar District, Aktobe Region, Kazakhstan. It is 142 kilometres (88 mi) long and has a catchment area of 1,810 square kilometres (700 sq mi).

The river is part of the Shalkar Basin. It is fed mainly by snow. Its waters are used to water livestock.

== Course ==
The Kauylzhyr has its sources on the southeastern slopes of the Mugalzhar Hills. It heads roughly southeastwards most of its course. In its final stretch it bends southwards and enters lake Shalkar from the north.

The width of the river channel is between 50 m (160 ft) and 150 m (490 ft). The main tributaries of the Kauylzhyr are the Alabassay, Karabulaksay, Sarysay and Koganzhar.

== See also ==
- List of rivers of Kazakhstan
