= Dike Kokaral =

Dam over the Aral Sea

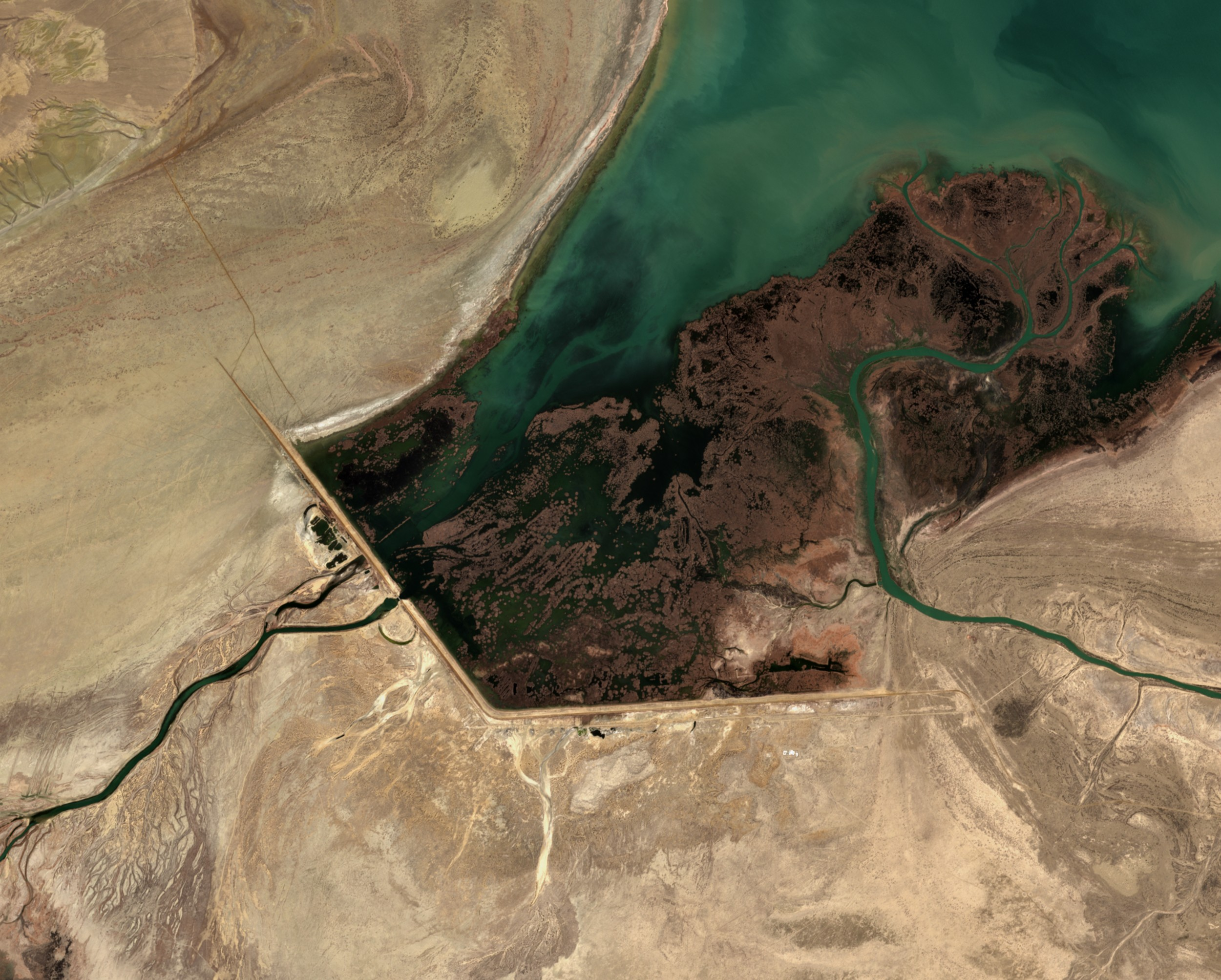
- Dike Kokaral in 2021.
- Interactive map of Dike Kokaral
- Coordinates: 46°05′48″N 60°47′35″E

Dike Kokaral is a 12 km (7.5 mi) long dam across a narrow stretch of the former Aral Sea, splitting off the North Aral Sea (also called "The Small Sea") from the area that once contained the much larger South Aral Sea ("The Large Sea"). The dike is conserving the dwindling waters of the Syr Darya river and maintaining (and attempting to revive) the damaged ecology of the North Aral Sea, at the expense of sealing the fate of the larger South Aral. Work was completed in August 2005, with help from the World Bank. Dike Kokaral is named after the Kokaral peninsula (an island until the 1960s), which would connect it to the other shore of the Aral Sea and separate the northern from the southern seas.

== History ==
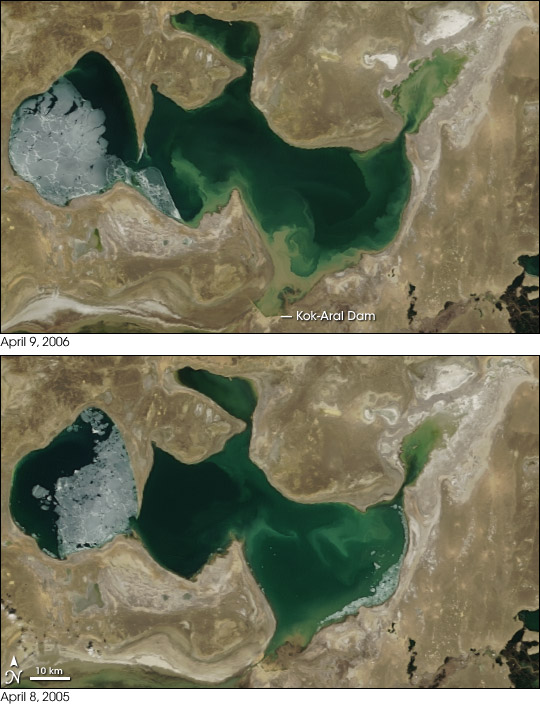
Comparison of the North Aral Sea before (below) and after (above) the construction of Dike Kokaral.

As the waters of the contributory rivers to the Aral have been progressively redirected for irrigation, the water levels in the Aral have fallen, the shore receded, and the water quality has dropped precipitously. The dike was built twice in the past from local sand, but due to a lack of funding necessary to strengthen it once the water level in the North Aral Sea (and therefore pressure to the dike) began to rise, the dike was washed away. This happened in 1992 and 1998. However, for the short time that the dike stood, positive changes were already noticed - the climate became milder, and fauna was partially restored. When the dike was washed away, the water level fell again, as much of the water poured into the South Aral Sea. In some places, the coastline of North Aral retreated by as much as a few hundred meters.

== North Aral's sea level ==
Comparison of the North Aral Sea in 2000 and 2011.

After the completion of Dike Kokaral, the water level of the North Aral has risen, and its salinity has decreased. By 2006, some recovery of the sea level was recorded, sooner than expected. "The dam has caused the small Aral's sea level to rise swiftly to 38 m (125 ft), from a low of less than 30 m (98 ft), with 42 m (138 ft) considered the level of viability." Economically significant stocks of fish have returned, and observers who had written off the North Aral Sea as an environmental catastrophe were surprised by reports that in 2006 its returning waters already were partly reviving the fishing industry and producing a catch for export as far as Ukraine. The restoration reportedly gave rise to long-absent rain clouds and possible microclimate changes, bringing tentative hope to an agricultural sector swallowed by a regional dustbowl, and some expansion of the shrunken sea. The sea, which had receded almost 100 km (62 mi) south of the port-city of Aralsk, was a mere 12 km (7.5 mi) away by 2015.
