= Barsuki Desert =

Desert region of Kazakhstan

Barsuki Desert Үлкен Борсық, Кіші Борсық Большие Барсуки, Малые Барсуки
- Desert
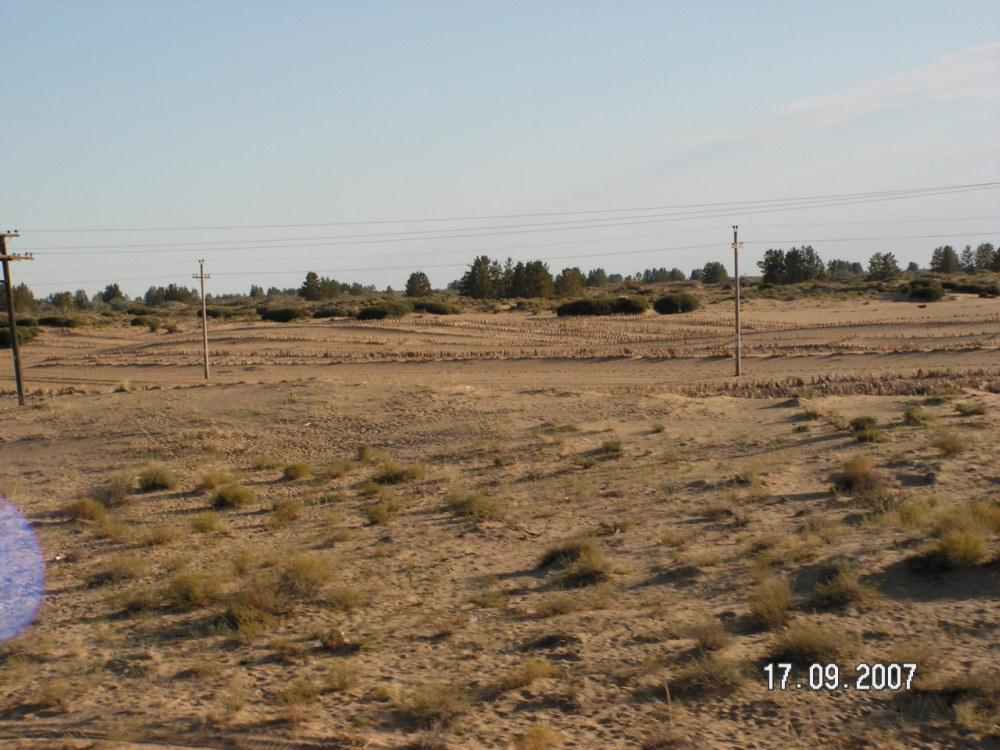
- Sand dune stabilization in the Barsuki Desert

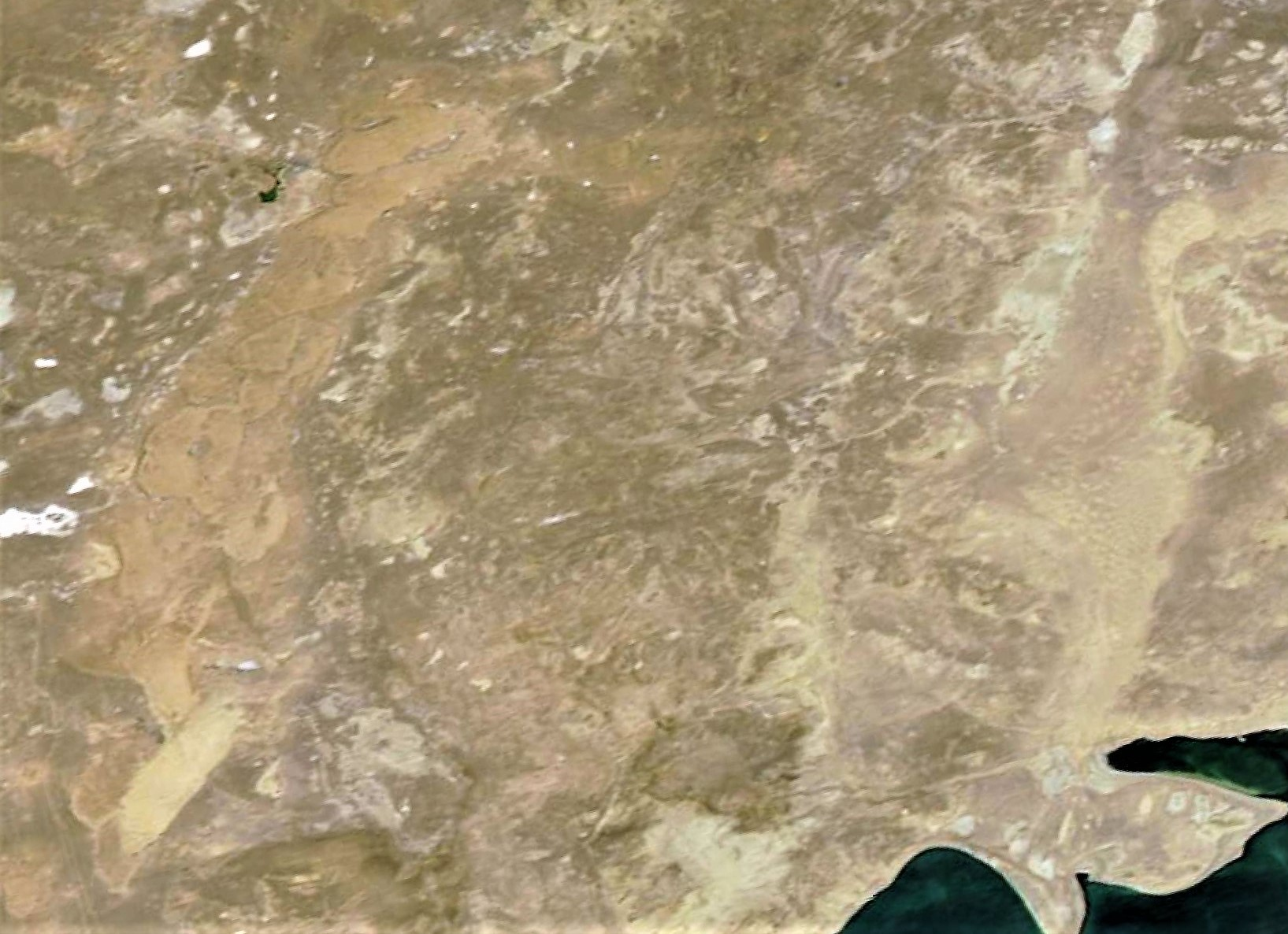
- Greater and Lesser Barsuki NASA picture

- Location within Kazakhstan
- Coordinates: 47°47′N 59°42′E
- Location: Kazakhstan
- Part of: Turgay Depression

Dimensions
  - Length: 120 kilometers (75 mi) and 80 kilometers (50 mi)
  - Width: 20 kilometers (12 mi) and 10 kilometers (6.2 mi)
- Elevation: 100 meters (330 ft)
- Highest elevation: 213 meters (699 ft)

The Barsuki Desert is a desert zone in the Aktobe and Kyzylorda regions of Kazakhstan. It has two parts, the Greater Barsuki (Kazakh: Үлкен Борсық; Russian: Большие Барсуки) in the west and the Lesser Barsuki (Kazakh: Кіші Борсық; Russian: Малые Барсуки) in the east. They are elongated strips of sand desert parallel to each other and separated by a roughly 65 kilometers (40 mi) wide stretch of non-desert terrain.

The sands of the deserts are the result of the weathering of Paleogene rocks; only the northern section of the Greater Barsuki was formed from more recent alluvial deposits.

== Geography ==
The Barsuki are roughly aligned in a SSW - NNE direction. They are located at the southern end of the Turgay Depression, stretching from the northern coast of the Aral Sea in the Kyzylorda Region to the southeastern sector of the Aktobe Region. The Shalkar Basin extends to the west.

The desert is sandy and receives very little rainfall. Its sands are subject to eolic action, forming mounds, ridges and dunes.

=== Greater Barsuki ===
The Greater Barsuki, also known as "Major Barsuki", has a length of 120 kilometers (75 mi), an average width of 25 kilometers (16 mi) and an area of 3,300 square kilometers (1,300 sq mi). It stretches from the area southeast of Begimbet in the south to a little to the northeast of Shalkar town.

=== Lesser Barsuki ===
The Lesser Barsuki, also known as "Minor Barsuki", lies to the east of its greater neighbor and stretches for 80 kilometers (50 mi) from Butakov Bay in the North Aral Sea by Akespe, to a little to the northwest of Karashokat in the Kyzylorda Region. Its width is between 10 kilometers (6.2 mi) and 25 kilometers (16 mi). The average height is 150 meters (490 ft) to 170 meters (560 ft), with the highest elevation of 213 meters (699 ft) located roughly in the middle.

== Flora ==
The vegetation of the flat areas consists mainly of xerophytic shrubs, including wormwood, saltwort and ephemeral plants. In the slopes of hills and ridges there are thickets of dzhuzgun, sand acacia, astragalus, kandym and chingil.

== See also ==
- Geography of Kazakhstan
