= Begimbet =

Begimbet Бегімбет Бегимбет بەگىمبەت
- Location within Kazakhstan
- Coordinates: 47°05′29″N 59°04′04″E
- Country: Kazakhstan
- Region: Aktobe
- Elevation: 169 m (554 ft)
- Time zone: UTC+5 (West Kazakhstan Time)
  - Summer (DST): UTC+5 (West Kazakhstan Time)

Begimbet, also known as Sarybulak, (Kazakh: Бегімбет, Begımbet, بەگىمبەت; Russian: Бегимбет, Begimbet) is a town in Aktobe Region, west Kazakhstan. It lies at an altitude of 169 m (554 ft).

== Geography ==
The village is located near the southern end of the Greater Barsuki Desert.
