= Bəyimli, Agsu =

Bəyimli is a village and municipality in the Agsu Rayon of Azerbaijan. It has a population of 331.
