= Mugalzhar =

Mountain range in northwestern Kazakhstan

- Мұғалжар / Мугоджары
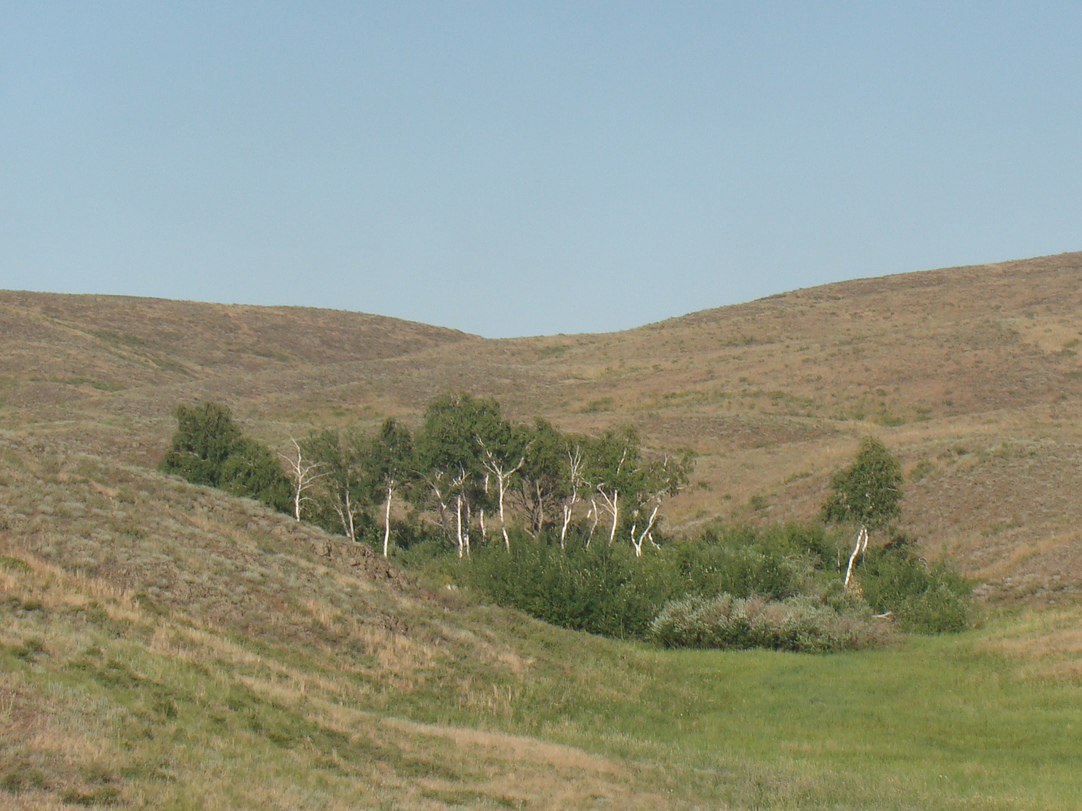
- Birch grove in the Mugalzhar

Highest point
- Peak: Ulken Baktybay
- Elevation: 657 m (2,156 ft)
- Coordinates: 48°38′38″N 58°32′47″E

Dimensions
- Length: 200 km (120 mi) N/S
- Width: 30 km (19 mi) E/W

Geography
- Location within Kazakhstan Location within European Russia
- Country: Kazakhstan
- Region: Aktobe
- Range coordinates: 48°39′N 58°33′E

Geology
- Rock age(s): Precambrian, Paleozoic
- Rock type(s): Sandstone, conglomerate, quartzite, schist, gneiss, granite, shale

Mugalzhar (Kazakh: Мұғалжар), also known as Mugodzhar Hills or Mugodzhar Range (Russian: Мугоджары), is a mountain range of moderate height in the Aktobe Region of northwestern Kazakhstan.

== Geography ==
Stretching in a roughly north/south direction, the Mugalzhar is a southern prolongation of the Ural Mountains. The northernmost section a narrow ridge that branches into two almost parallel ridges separated by the gently undulating 20 kilometers (12 mi) Alabass Basin (Russian: Алабасская котловина).

The Mugalzhar has a length of about 200 kilometers (120 mi) with a width of 30 kilometers (19 mi). It stretches from the Or River (река Орь) as a narrow range that further south splits in two: the Eastern Mugalzhar and Western Mugalzhar. The highest point is 657 meters (2,156 ft) high Mount Ulken Baktybay (Boktybay), rising in the Eastern Mugalzhar.

Located at the southern end, the Shoshkakol Buirat is a spur of low hills reaching a height of 408 meters (1,339 ft). In the northern section, the wider Mugalzhar connects with the Guberlin Mountains.

=== Hydrography ===
The Mugalzhar forms the divide between the Caspian and Aral Sea basins. Some of the rivers having their sources in the Mugalzhar are Or, Emba, Irgiz, Zhylandysay, Bolgasyn and Kauylzhyr.
