= Shalkar District =

Shalkar
- District
- Шалқар ауданы
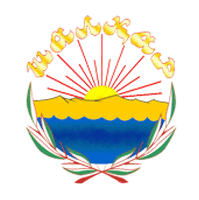
- Seal

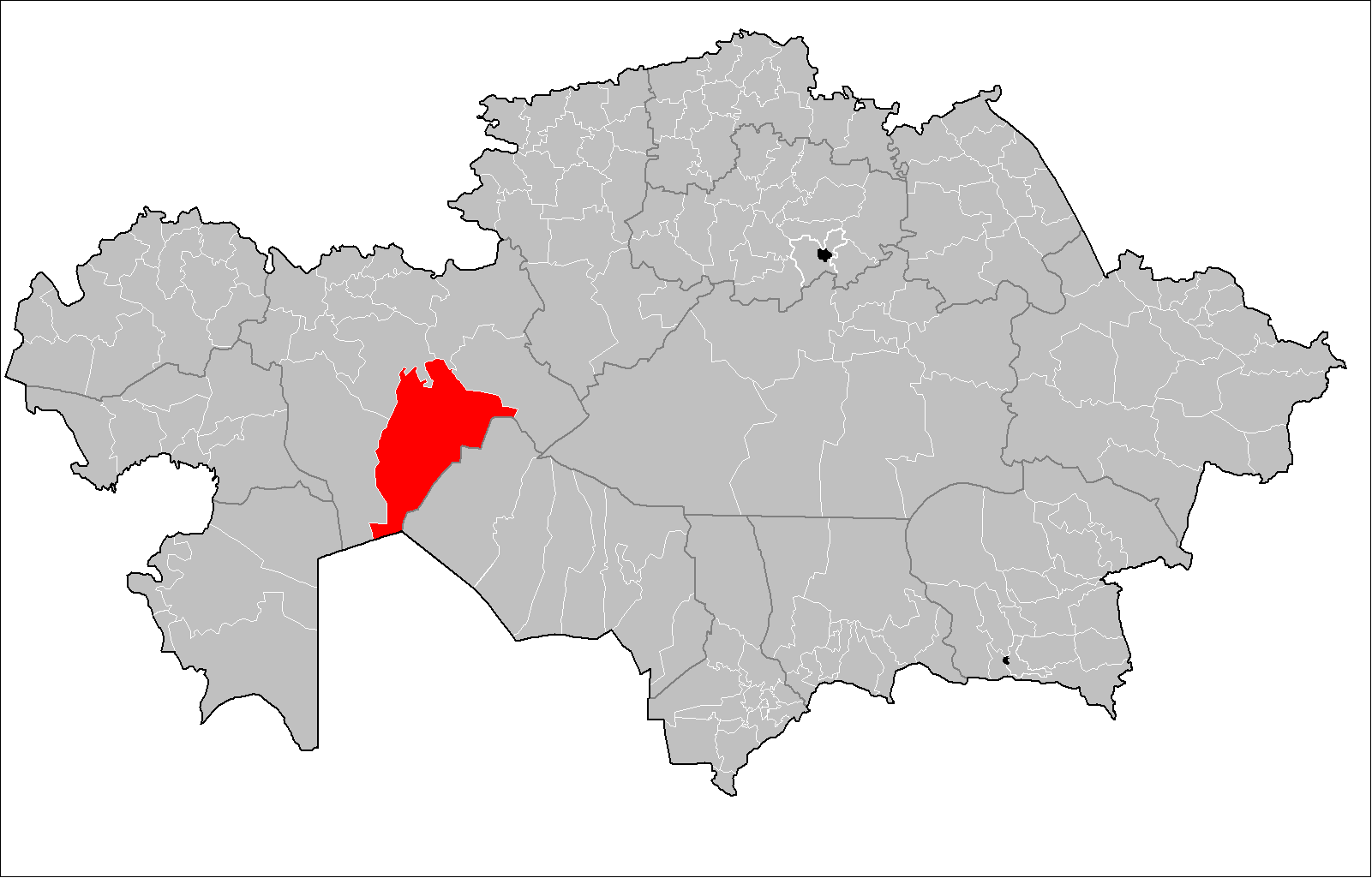
- Coordinates: 47°0′50″N 59°0′36″E
- Country: Kazakhstan
- Region: Aktobe Region
- Administrative center: Shalkar

Government
  - Akim: Zhidekhanov Zhanbolat Otegulovich

Population (2013)
  - Total: 45,513
- Time zone: UTC+5 (West)

Shalkar (Kazakh: Шалқар ауданы, Şalqar audany) is a district of Aktobe Region in Kazakhstan. The administrative center of the district is the town of Shalkar. Population: 45,513 (2013 estimate); 44,187 (2009 census results); 46,697 (1999 census results).

== Geography ==
The Shalkar Basin and a number of lakes in it which are mostly salty, such as Tebez and Zhamantuz, are part of the district. Rivers Zhylandysay, Kauylzhyr and Bolgasyn flow across the territory of the district. The Lesser Barsuki Desert lies in the eastern part.

== History ==
The Chelkar district was formed as part of the Aktobe province on October 21, 1921. July 5, 1922, was transformed into Chelkar district. In 1928, the district was recreated as part of the Aktobe District. In 1930, he passed into direct subordination to the Kazakh ASSR. In 1932 he moved to the Aktobe region. On March 10, 2000, by decree of the President of Kazakhstan the transcription of the name of Chelkar district in Russian was changed to Shalkar district.
