= North Aral Sea =

Extant lake

- Солтүстік Арал теңізі (Kazakh); Северное Аральское море (Russian)
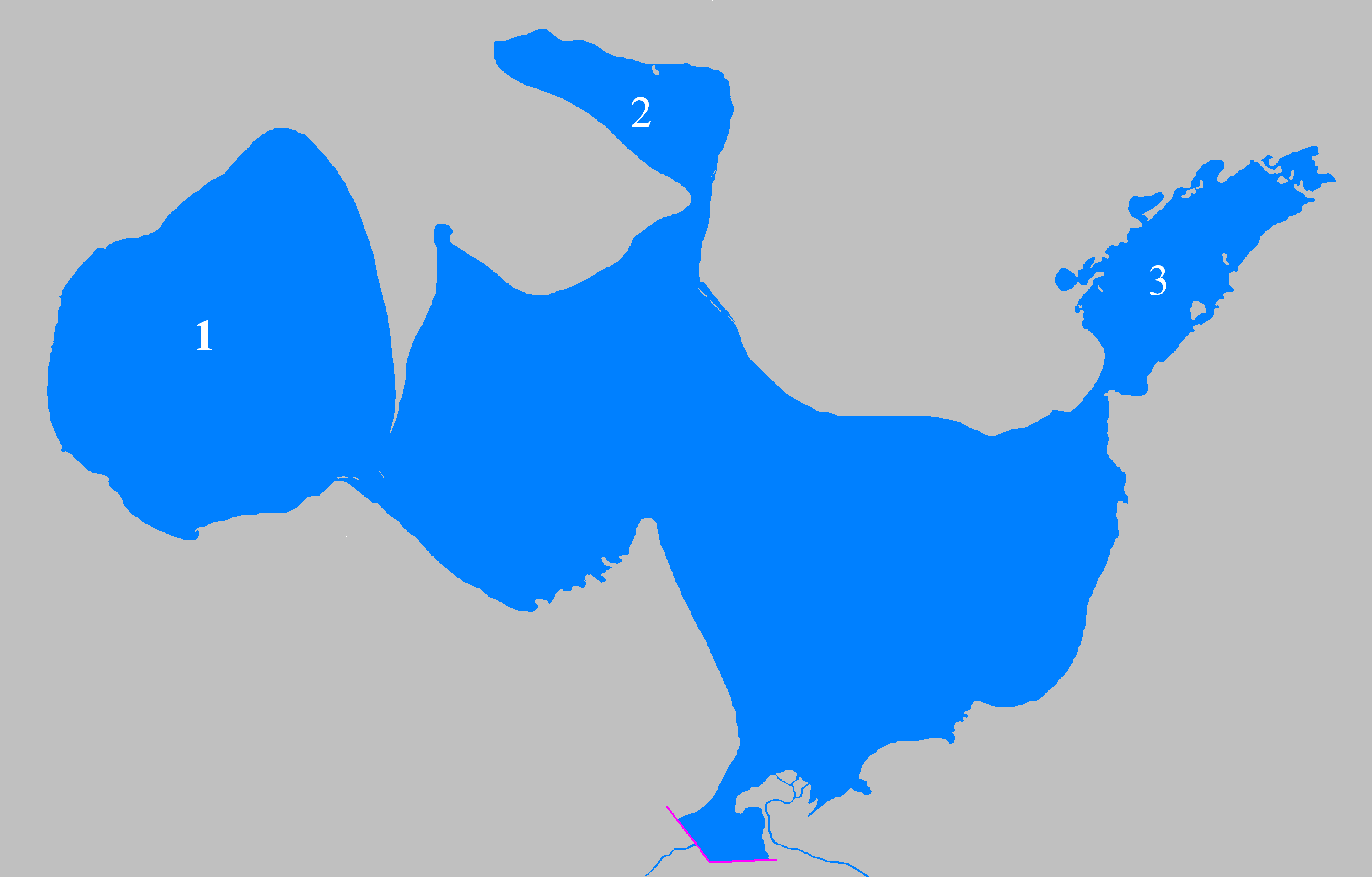
- 1. Shevchenko Bay, 2. Butakov Bay, 3. Bolshoy Saryshyganak Bay

- Location within Kazakhstan Location within Asia
- Location: Kazakhstan, Central Asia
- Coordinates: 46.5°N 60.7°E
- Type: endorheic, salt lake, natural lake, reservoir
- Primary inflows: Syr Darya (previously also the Amu Darya)
- Basin countries: Kazakhstan
- Surface area: 3,300 km^{2} (1,270 mi^{2}) (2008); 2,550 km^{2} (985 mi^{2}) (2003)
- Max. depth: 30 m (98 ft) (2003); 42 m (138 ft) (2008)

Ramsar Wetland
- Official name: Lesser Aral Sea and Delta of the Syrdarya River
- Designated: 2 February 2012
- Reference no.: 2083

The North Aral Sea (Kazakh: Soltüstık Aral teñızı) is the portion of the former Aral Sea that is fed by the Syr Darya River. It split from the South Aral Sea in 1987–1988 as water levels dropped due to river diversion for agriculture.

In 1925 a large site containing numerous fossils of the Oligocene was discovered near the village of Akespe by the northern shore of the Aral Sea.

== Background ==
The Aral Sea began shrinking in the 1960s, when the Soviet Union decided that the two rivers feeding it, the Amu Darya and the Syr Darya, would be diverted to irrigate cotton and food crops in Kazakhstan and Uzbekistan. In 1987–1988, due to an accelerated loss of water, the Aral Sea split into northern and southern parts; the southern part was the former South Aral Sea.

After the fall of the Soviet Union, the government of independent Kazakhstan decided to restore the northern lake fed by Syr Darya. In 2003, the lake was 30 m (98 ft) in depth and 2,550 km^{2} (985 mi^{2}) in area (JAXA source: 3,200 km^{2} (1,240 mi^{2})); by 2008 it had reached 42 m (138 ft) in depth and 3,300 km^{2} (1,270 mi^{2}) in area (JAXA source: 3,600 km^{2} (1,390 mi^{2})).

The poorly built Dike Kokaral intended to contain the North Aral Sea and save its fisheries failed twice, but in 2005, the government of Kazakhstan was able to fund a more robust design. Since then, water levels have risen faster than expected and fish stocks have increased. Plans to build a second dike to increase water levels further were due to begin in 2010, but have so far not materialized. There is now an ongoing effort in Kazakhstan to save and replenish the North Aral Sea. As part of this effort, a dam project was completed in 2005; in 2008, the water level in this lake had risen by 12 m (39 ft) from its level in 2003. Salinity has dropped, and fish are again found in sufficient numbers for some fishing to be viable, especially mackerel introduced at the Syr Darya river delta, though attempts to introduce tuna in 2009 failed.

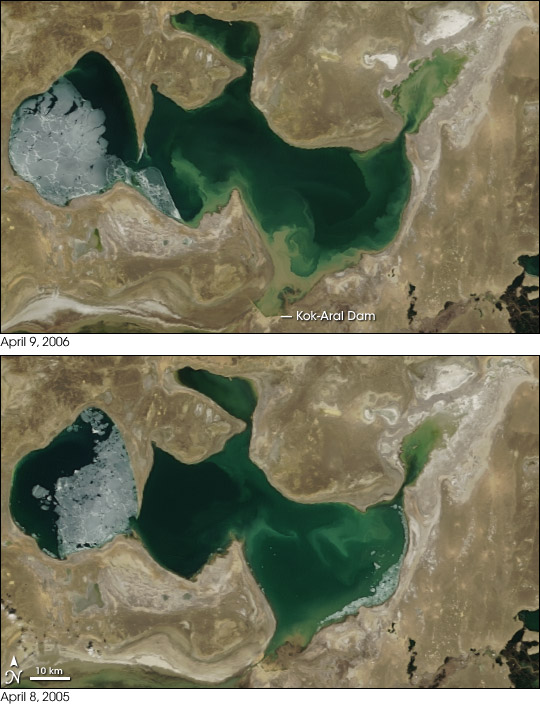
April 2005 and April 2006 comparisons.

Comparison of the North Aral Sea in 2000 and 2011.

== Different projects ==
=== Heightening the existing dike ===
The Kokaral dam could be raised by several meters, which would restore this lake to its pre-1970 level.

=== West outflow on the Shevchenko Bay ===
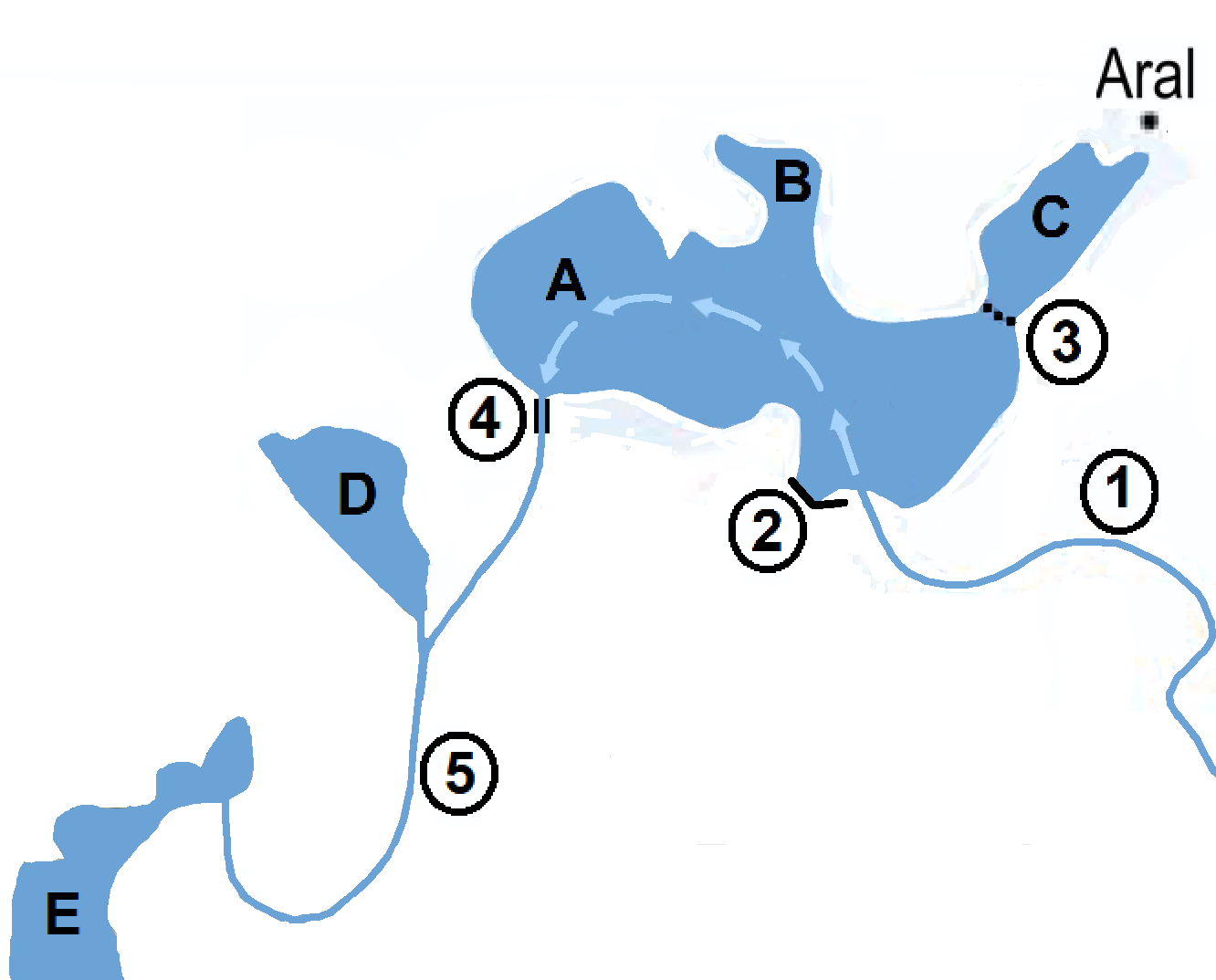
North Aral Sea with a west outfall 1= Syr-Daria 2= Raised Dike Kokaral 3= Control of the Saryshyganak Bay 4= Shevchenko Bay exit control 5= Emissary from the Small Aral Sea to the Western Aral Basin A= Shevchenko bay B= Butakov bay C= Saryshyganak bay D= Barsakelmes Lake E= Western Aral Sea basin.

A discharge on the Shevchenko Bay, in the former Auzykokaral Strait, west of the former Kokaral Island, would allow available water to be used towards the other remnants of the Aral Sea, Barsakelmes Lake and the western basin, preventing this water from being lost in the sandy desert that the eastern part of the ancient sea has become, as is currently the case.

=== Rehabilitation of the Saryshyganak Bay ===
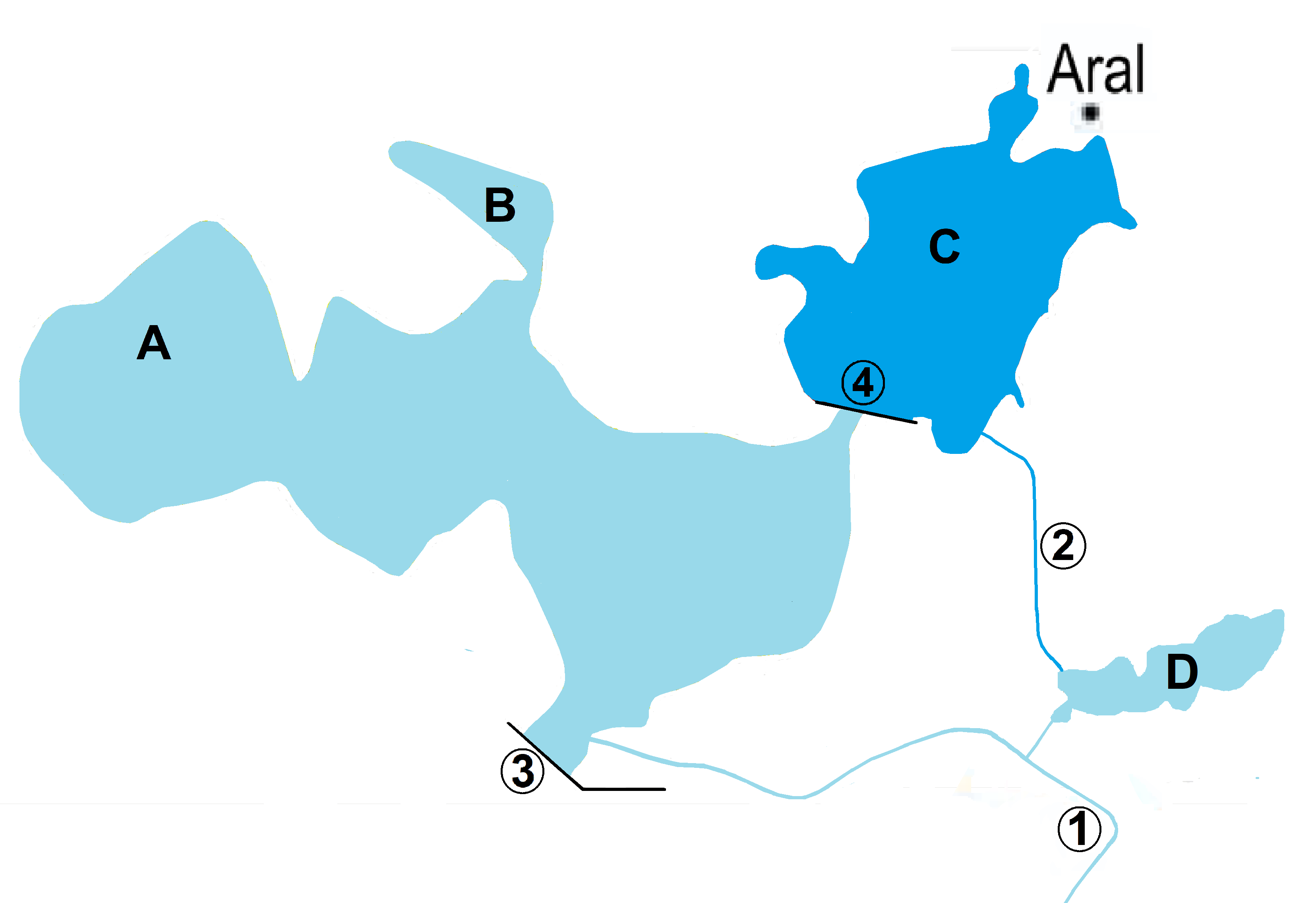
Rehabilitation of the Saryshyganak Bay (Kamyslybas option) 1= Syr Daria 2= Saryshyganak Basin Feeder Channel 3= Existing Dike Kokaral 4= High Dam A= Shevchenko bay B= Butakov bay C= Saryshyganak bay D= Kamyslybas.

Another project would be the construction of a second dam further north, halfway between Kokaral and Aralsk, this city would thus regain its maritime space. The lake would then be in two parts, only the upper level, corresponding to the Saryshyganak bay, would return to the level before 1970. A supply channel would be necessary, for this several options are possible : a canal of around sixty km long coming from the Syr Daria, a channel coming from the Kamyslybas or even a channel coming from upper north avoiding arid regions.

== See also ==
- Water scarcity
