= Shalkar =

Shalkar Шалқар Şalqar
- Town
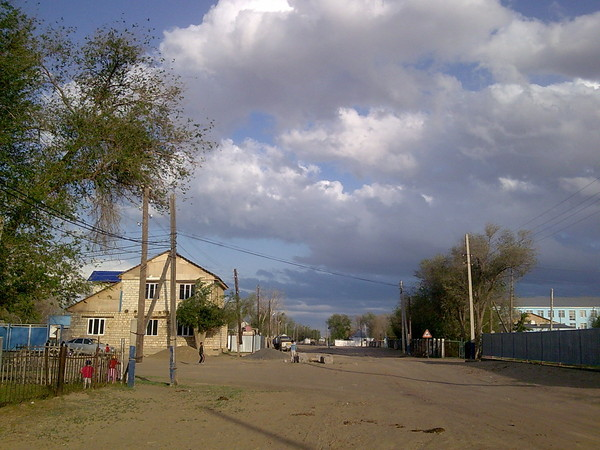
- Mamedova Street

- Location in Aktobe Province, Kazakhstan
- Coordinates: 47°50′N 59°36′E
- Country: Kazakhstan
- Region: Aktobe Region
- District: Shalkar District
- Settlement: 1870

Area
  - Total: 4.6 sq mi (12 km^{2})

Population (2009)
  - Total: 26,574
- Time zone: UTC+5 (Yekaterinburg Time)

Shalkar (Note: Kazakh: Шалқар, romanized: Şalqar, pronounced [ʃɑɫqʰɑ́r]) is a town and the administrative center of Shalkar District in Aktobe Region of western Kazakhstan. Population: 26,574 (2009 census results); 26,329 (1999 census results).

== Geography ==
The town is located in the southeastern sector of the Aktobe Region near the northern end of the Greater Barsuki Desert, close to Lake Shalkar.

=== Climate ===
Shalkar has a semi-arid climate (Köppen: BSk) with very cold winters and hot summers.

Climate data for Shalkar (1991–2020)
Month	Jan	Feb	Mar	Apr	May	Jun	Jul	Aug	Sep	Oct	Nov	Dec	Year
Mean daily maximum °C (°F)	−8.2 (17.2)	−6.9 (19.6)	2.4 (36.3)	16.7 (62.1)	25.2 (77.4)	31.5 (88.7)	33.3 (91.9)	31.8 (89.2)	24.4 (75.9)	15.1 (59.2)	2.6 (36.7)	−5.4 (22.3)	13.5 (56.3)
Daily mean °C (°F)	−12.7 (9.1)	−12.2 (10.0)	−3.3 (26.1)	9.6 (49.3)	17.5 (63.5)	23.7 (74.7)	25.6 (78.1)	23.6 (74.5)	16.0 (60.8)	7.3 (45.1)	−2.4 (27.7)	−9.7 (14.5)	6.9 (44.4)
Mean daily minimum °C (°F)	−16.8 (1.8)	−16.7 (1.9)	−7.6 (18.3)	3.6 (38.5)	10.0 (50.0)	15.4 (59.7)	17.6 (63.7)	15.5 (59.9)	8.5 (47.3)	1.2 (34.2)	−6.2 (20.8)	−13.6 (7.5)	0.9 (33.6)
Average precipitation mm (inches)	12.0 (0.47)	10.3 (0.41)	18.4 (0.72)	20.1 (0.79)	22.5 (0.89)	17.4 (0.69)	15.0 (0.59)	8.1 (0.32)	5.9 (0.23)	16.8 (0.66)	16.6 (0.65)	15.0 (0.59)	178.1 (7.01)
Average precipitation days (≥ 1.0 mm)	3.6	3.2	4.3	3.9	4.1	3.3	3.4	1.6	1.5	3.2	3.8	4.2	40.1
Source: NOAA

== History ==
Shalkar (Chelkar) was founded in 1870 as a settlement. At the time, Chelkar was a part of Irgizsky Uyezd of Turgay Oblast and was connected to Yrgyz by a road. In the 1900s, the railroad connecting Orenburg and Tashkent was built. Chelkar became an important railway station. Between 1905 and 1907 the station building, the locomotive depot, as well as other facilities including a school and a hospital, were built. In 1918, Chelkar was an area of battles during the Russian Civil War.

In 1920, Turgay Oblast was transformed to Turgay Governorate, and in 1921, it was abolished and included into Orenburg-Turgay Governorate. On May 26, 1921 Irgizsky District, a successor of Irgizsky Uyezd, was transferred to Aktyubinsk Governorate of Kirghiz Autonomous Soviet Socialist Republic. On July 5, 1922 the district was abolished, and Shalkar became the administrative center of Chelkarsky Uyezd. In 1925, the republic was renamed Kazak Autonomous Socialist Soviet Republic. On January 17, 1928 the governorate was abolished, and Chelkar was transferred to Aktyubinsk Okrug. The uyezds were abolished as well, and Chelkarsky Raion (District) was established.

In 1928, Shalkar was granted a town status. On December 17, 1930 the okrug was abolished, and the districts became directly subordinate to the republic. In 1932, Aktobe Region was established, and in 1936, the republic was transformed into Kazakh Soviet Socialist Republic. In the 1930s Shalkar became a place for political exile, in particular, from Saint Petersburg.

== Economy ==
=== Industry ===
Shalkar is mostly serving the railway; there is a carriage repair plant. There are also food industry enterprises.

=== Transportation ===
Shalkar is a railway station on the Trans-Aral Railway, which connects Orenburg and Tashkent. A branch line connects to Beyneu, from where trains can continue to various destinations, including the Caspian Sea port of Aktau. It is also connected to Irgiz by a road. This connection provides an access to the E38 highway between Aktobe and Shymkent.

== Sport ==
A team was sent to the 2014 Youth Bandy Championship of Kazakhstan and also to the first round of the National Rink Bandy Championships in 2015 for players born in 1999-2000, held in Oral.
