= Shalkar (lake, Aktobe Region) =

Lake in Kazakhstan

- Шалқар
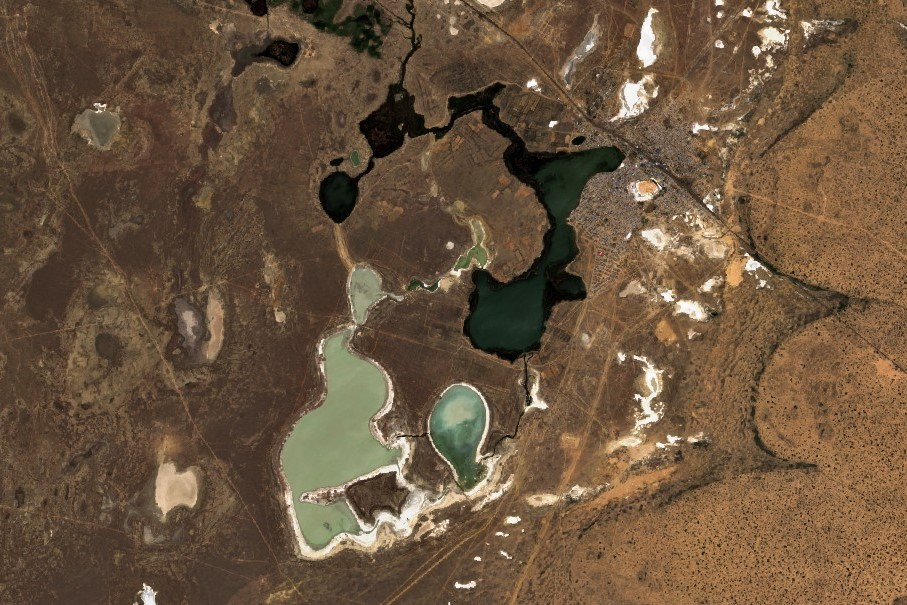
- Sentinel-2 picture of the lake

- Location within Kazakhstan
- Location: Aktobe Region
- Coordinates: 47°48′50″N 59°35′30″E
- Type: Brackish lake
- Primary inflows: Kauylzhyr
- Catchment area: 2,460 square kilometers (950 sq mi)
- Basin countries: Kazakhstan
- Max. length: 12 kilometers (7.5 mi)
- Max. width: 5 kilometers (3.1 mi)
- Surface area: 7.9 square kilometers (3.1 sq mi)
- Max. depth: 5 meters (16 ft)
- Water volume: 0.0065 cubic kilometers (0.0016 cu mi)
- Residence time: UTC+5
- Surface elevation: 167 meters (548 ft)
- Settlements: Shalkar

Shalkar (Kazakh: Шалқар) is a brackish lake in Shalkar District, Aktobe Region, Kazakhstan.

Shalkar city lies by the northeastern lakeshore. The lake provides water to the city and adjacent railway stations.

== Geography ==
Shalkar is located 127 kilometers (79 mi) km to the NNW of the Aral Sea. It lies in the Shalkar Basin, a wide tectonic depression between the Mugalzhar Hills to the west and the Barsuki Desert to the east. The Kauylzhyr river flows from the north into the northern end. The lake presently consists in a roughly oval string of residual pools with an expanse of dry terrain at the center. The pools forming the lake freeze on average by early November and thaw in late March to early April. The ice thickness in the middle of the winter reaches between 50 centimeters (20 in) and 70 centimeters (28 in).

== History ==
Shalkar is a drying lake. It had been larger and deeper until the 20th century. In 1937 a stone and concrete dam was built in order to decrease the salinity of the northern part of the lake. This dam divided lake Shalkar into two sections, with the southern pools increasing in salinity as the fresh water from the Kauylzhyr rarely reached them. The southern section is known as "Old Shalkar" and it often dries up in the summer.

The lakeshore retreated as it became covered in reeds and a thick layer of silt accumulated at the bottom. At the beginning of the 20th century the volume of the lake had been 25,000,000 cubic meters (880,000,000 cu ft) but nowadays it is hardly 6,500,000 cubic meters (230,000,000 cu ft). Meanwhile the maximum depth of the lake decreased from 13 meters (43 ft) to 5 meters (16 ft).

== Flora and fauna ==
Shalkar is located on the path of seasonal migrations of water birds. There are reeds growing on the Shalkar lakeshore and in the area of the Kauylzhyr river mouth. These provide a habitat for birds such as the egret, spoonbill, glossy ibis, whooper swan, demoiselle crane, little bustard and the Pallas's gull.

Among the fifteen fish species found in the lake, the Caspian tyulka and Caspian roach deserve mention. The fish fauna has greatly diminished in recent decades.

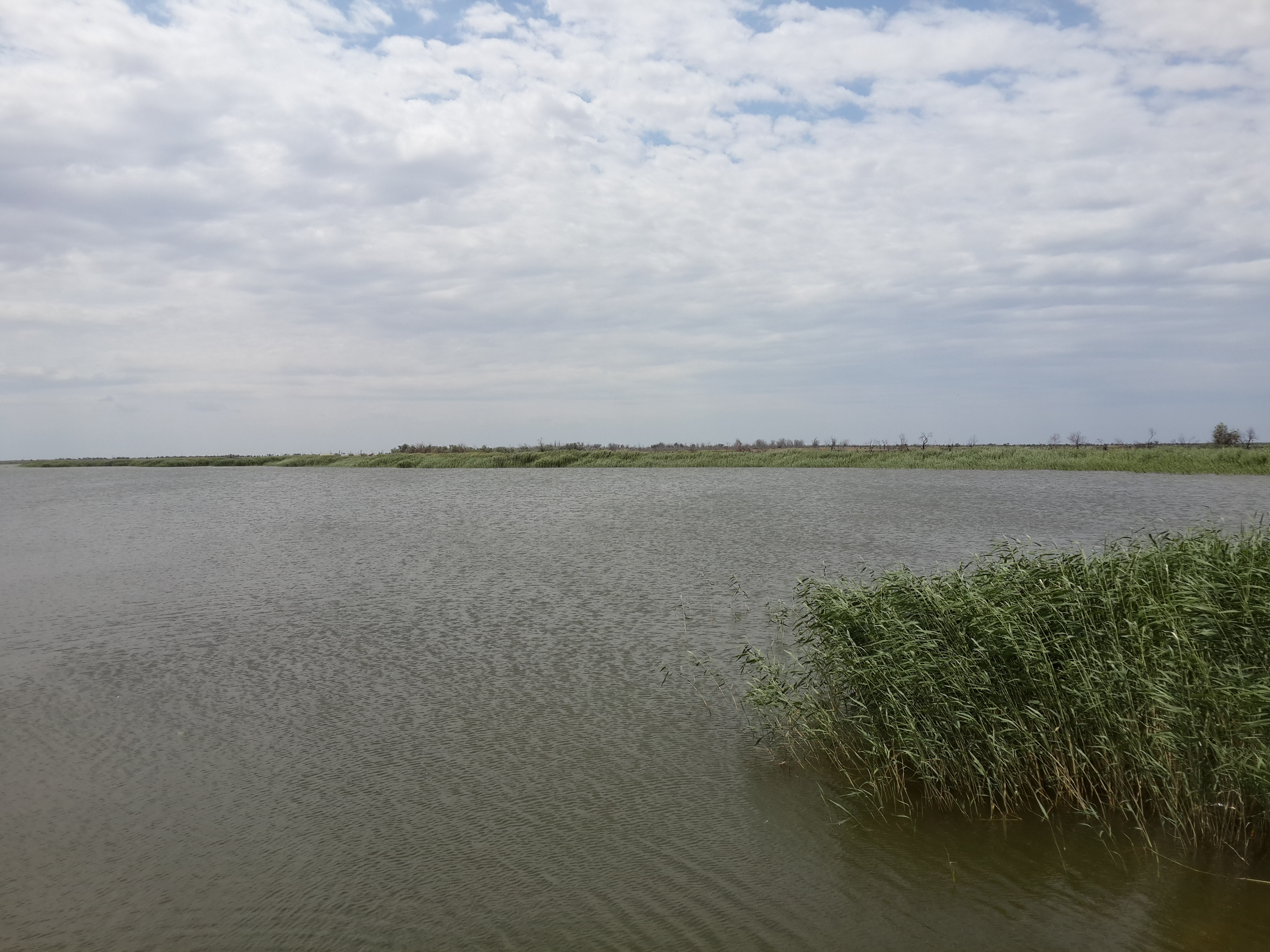
Reeds on the Shalkar lakeshore.

== See also ==
- List of drying lakes
- List of lakes of Kazakhstan
