= Basra (disambiguation) =

Basra is the capital of Basra Governorate, in Iraq.

Basra may also refer to:

== Places ==
=== Iraq ===
- Basra Governorate, a governorate in southern Iraq
- Basra Province, Ottoman Empire
- Basra International Airport
- University of Basrah

=== Other places ===
- Basra-ye Bala, Mazandaran Province, Iran
- Basra-ye Pain, Mazandaran Province, Iran
- Basra, Morocco, archaeological site in Morocco
- Basra, Pakistan, village in Chakwal District, Pakistan
- Basrah, Yemen, a village in Yemen

== Battles ==
- Battle of Basra (1914), a battle between British and Ottoman troops in World War I
- Battle of Basra (2003), one of the first battles of the 2003 invasion of Iraq, involving the British 7 Armoured Brigade
- Battle of Basra (2008), an operation by the Iraqi Army to drive the Mahdi Army militia out of the city

== People ==
- Al-Hariri of Basra (1054–1122), Arab poet, scholar of the Arabic language and a high government official of the Seljuk Empire
- Asif Basra (1967–2020), Indian actor
- David of Basra (3rd- and 4th-century CE), Christian Metropolitan bishop
- Geeta Basra (born 1984), British actress who has acted in Bollywood actress
- Riaz Basra (1967–2002), Pakistani militant

== Other uses ==
- Basra (game), a card game widely played in Lebanon, Egypt and Syria
- Basra (album), a 1965 Blue Note jazz album by Pete La Roca, featuring Joe Henderson
- Basra (2008 film), a 2008 Egyptian film
- Basra, a 2010 Hindi film directed by Navdeep Singh
- Ottoman destroyer Basra, Durandal-class destroyer used by the Ottoman Navy

== See also ==
- 1991 uprising in Basra, the scene of the beginning of the unrest in Iraq following the Gulf War
- Basra reed warbler, a bird endemic in Iraq and Israel
- Basara (disambiguation)
- Basar (disambiguation)
- Barsa (disambiguation)
