= Barsakelmes =

Barsakelmes or Barsa-Kelmes or variation (Russian: Барсакельмес, Kazakh: Барсакелмес, Barsakelmes meaning "the place of no return"), may refer to:

- Barsa-Kelmes, a former island in the desertified defunct Aral Sea
- Barsa-Kelmes Nature Reserve, located on the former island
- Barsakelmes Lake, a lake located in the desertified Aral Sea basin, between the Western Aral Sea and Northern Aral Sea, in the northern part of the former Eastern Aral Sea
- Attulus barsakelmes (A. barsakelmes), a species of Kazakhstani spider

== See also ==
- Kelme (disambiguation)
- Barsa (disambiguation)
