= Kelm =

Kelm is either a German language topographic or a habitational surname, in the first case denoting a person who lived near a hill (Old Slavic cholm "peak", "hill") or in the second case someone who came from Chełm in eastern Poland or from any of several similar named smaller settlement. Notable people with the surname include:

- Annette Kelm (1975), German artist and photographer
- Tab Hunter, born Arthur Andrew Kelm (1931–2018), American actor, singer, film producer and author
- Bernhard Kelm (1967), retired German long jumper
- Duncan Kelm (1988), American rugby union player
- Dustin Kelm (1972), American unicyclist
- Erna Kelm (1908–1962), German victim of the Berlin Wall
- Erwin Kelm (1911–1994), American businessman
- Gabriele Kelm (1872–1921), German rower
- George L. Kelm (1931–2019), American archaeologist
- Larry Kelm (1964–2014), American football player
- Viktor Kelm (1997), Kyrgyz footballer

== See also ==
- Chelm (disambiguation)
- Kelme (disambiguation)
