= KELM =

KELM or variation, may refer to:

- the ICAO code for Elmira/Corning Regional Airport, in Chemung County, New York, United States
- KELM-LP, a defunct low-power television station (channel 43) formerly licensed to Reno, Nevada, United States
- Kelmė, also spelt Kelm, a Lithuanian town
- Kelm, a surname
- kernel extreme learning machine, a method in statistics
- Quilme people, who call themselves Kélm(e)

== See also ==
- Chelm (disambiguation)
- Kelme (disambiguation)
