= Barsa =

Barsa may refer to:

== Places ==
- Barsa, Burkina Faso
- Bârsa (disambiguation)
  - Bârsa, a commune in Arad County, Romania
- Barsa, Lebanon, a village in Koura District
- Barsa, Idlib, a village in Idlib, Syria
- Mount Barsa, a mountain in Syria
- Barsa Subdivision, a former local service district annexed by the town of Rothesay, New Brunswick in 1998
- Barsa uttar pardesh

== Other uses ==
- Barsa (encyclopedia)
- Barsa (film), a Tulu language film of 2016
- Barsa (novel), a 2008 Indian novel written by Khadeeja Mumtaz
- Odette Barsa (1901–1975), American lingerie designer

== See also ==
- Basra (disambiguation)
- Barsakelmes (disambiguation) including Barsa-Kelmes
