= List of paintings and drawings by Taras Shevchenko =

Taras Shevchenko (1814–1861) was a Ukrainian artist and poet.

== Works 1830–1847 ==
Image	Name	Technique	Dimensions	Year
	Bust of a Woman	Paper, Italian pencil	47.5 × 38	1830
	Portrait of Pavlo Engelhardt	Bristol board, watercolor	10.3 × 8.4	1833
	Head of a Woman	Paper, watercolor	11.6 × 9.1	1834
	Death of Lucretia	Paper, ink, pen	34.3 × 50.3	1835
	Death of Oleg, Prince of the Drevlians	Paper, ink, pen, brush	27.5 × 38.9	1836
	Alexander the Great Demonstrates Trust in His Physician Philip	Paper, watercolor, ink, pen	26 × 35.7	1836
	Death of Virginia	Paper, watercolor, ink, pen	25.1 × 35.7	1836
	Death of Bohdan Khmelnytsky	Paper, ink, brush, pen	30.8 × 45.1	1836–1837
	Death of Socrates	Paper, ink, brush, pen	24.5 × 32.3	1837
	Portrait of Kateryna Abaza	Bristol board, watercolor	22.5 × 18.1	1837
	Portrait of Yevhen Hrebinka	Bristol board, watercolor	21.3 × 18.8	1837
	Portrait of an Unknown Person	Bristol board, watercolor	23.7 × 17.6	1837–1838
	Portrait of a Girl with a Dog	Bristol board, watercolor	24.6 × 19.4	1838
	Portrait of Mykola Lunin	Bristol board, watercolor	24.6 × 19.5	1838
	Cossack Feast	Paper, pencil	23.3 × 34	December 25, 1838
	Head of the Mother	Oil	68 × 58	1838–1840
	Portrait of Anton Ivanovych Lahoda	Paper, watercolor	25.2 × 19.5	1839
	Portrait of Ivan Krylov	Paper, watercolor	24.6 × 19.5	1839–April 1841
	Portrait of Vasily Zhukovsky	Paper, watercolor	27.3 × 21	1839–1844
	Interrupted Meeting	Paper, watercolor	23 × 18.5	1839–1840
	Dream of Grandmother and Granddaughter	Paper, watercolor	21.9 × 27.6	1839–1840
	Woman in Bed	Paper, watercolor	23.1 × 19.1	1839–1840
	Portrait of a Junker	Bristol board, watercolor	16.9 × 14	1840
	Model	Paper, watercolor, bronze	16.3 × 20.5	1840
	Mary; Illustration to poem Poltava by Alexander Pushkin	Paper, watercolor, bronze	24.7 × 20.1	1840
	Portrait of an Unknown Woman with a Necklace	Paper, watercolor	21.5 × 17.7	1840
	Boy with a Dog in the Forest	Paper, sepia	23.1 × 18.3	1840
	Corner of the Smolensky Cemetery in Saint Petersburg	Pencil, sepia	17.8 × 26.5	Summer 1840
	Model.	Cardboard, oil	57 × 70.5	April 1840 – January 1842
	Models.	Toned Paper, charcoal, chalk	76 × 57	June 1840 – January 1841
	Self-Portrait.	Canvas (Oval), oil	43 × 35	Winter 1840–1841
	Model in the Pose of St. Sebastian.	Canvas, oil	72 × 54.2	Winter 1840–1841
	Portraits of Unknown People.	Paper, pencil	27.8 × 37.7	1840–1843
	Catholic Monk.	Steel engraving	—	April 30, 1841
	Gypsy Fortune-Teller.	Paper, watercolor	26.5 × 20.7	September 1841
	The Healer. Illustration for the work of the same name by Hryhorii Kvitka-Osnovianenko	Paper, pencil, ink, pen, brush	21.4 × 15.9	October 10, 1841
	The Healer. Illustration for the work of the same name by Hryhorii Kvitka-Osnovianenko	Woodcut	—	October 10, 1841
	The Meeting of Taras Bulba with His Sons; Illustration for the story by Nikolai Gogol	Paper, sepia	23.1 × 30.2	1842
	Portrait of Mykola Pavlovych Sokolovsky.	Bristol board, watercolor	25 × 21.9	1842
	Portrait of an Unknown Woman at the Piano.	Watercolor	—	1842
	Kateryna. Illustration to own poem	Canvas, oil	93 × 72.3	Summer 1842
	The Blind Woman with Her Daughter. Self-illustration for the poem The Blind Woman	Paper, pencil, sepia	21.5 × 17.8	1842
	King Lear; Composition on the theme of the tragedy by William Shakespeare	Paper, galvanography	12.4 × 9.2; 15.8 × 11.7; 20.7 × 14.6	February 10, 1843
	Portrait of Battle Painter Alexander Yevstafiyevich Kozebu	Paper, watercolor	27.9 × 22.5	1843
	In the Harem	Bristol paper, watercolor	24.7 × 20	1843
	Peasant Family	Canvas, oil	60 × 72.5	May 1843
	At the Apiary	Canvas, oil	53 × 41	May 1843
	Cossack volumeurist (The Blind)	Paper, sepia	14 × 11.1	May 1843
	Cossack volumeurist (The Blind)	Paper, sepia	14.5 × 10.5	May 1843
	Portrait of Majewska	Canvas, oil	41.5 × 35.7	May 1843
	Portrait of Rodion Ivanovych Lukomsky.	Paper, pencil	18.5 × 14	May 1843
	Vydubychi Monastery	Paper, pencil	17.6 × 26.1	October 1834
	Widow's House in Ukraine	Paper, pencil	22.7 × 29.5	May–October 1843
	Portrait of Panteleimon Kulish	Canvas, oil	40.3 × 32.2	May 1843 – January 1847
	Portrait of Nikolai Repnin-Volkonsky	Canvas, oil	63.6 × 50.5	X 1843
	Self-Portrait	Paper, ink, pen	22.7 × 18.4	23–26 XI 1843
	Portrait of Viktor Oleksiyovych Zakrevsky	Paper, pencil	34.5 × 23.3	XII 1843
	Portrait of Hanna Ivanivna Zakrevska.	Canvas, oil	51 × 39.6	9–23 XII 1843
	Portrait of Platon Oleksiyovych Zakrevsky	Canvas, oil	52 × 40.1	9–23 XII 1843
	Portrait of the Children of V. M. Repnin.	Canvas, oil	40 × 51.3	1–10 I 1844
	Model.	Toned Paper, pencil, charcoal	67.9 × 44.5	1844
	Gifts in Chyhyryn in 1649.	Paper, ink	19.7 × 27	March–April 1844
	Starosty.	Paper, ink, pen	18.4 × 27.6	March–April 1844
	Portrait of an Unknown Woman in Brown Clothing.	Bristol Board, watercolor	28.3 × 22.3	1845
	T. H. Shevchenko Drawing a Farmstead.	Paper, sepia	18.5 × 27	Spring 1845
	Portrait of Yosyp Fedorovych Rudzynsky.	Canvas, oil	45 × 35.5	April–May 1845
	House Over the Water.	Paper, pencil	15.9 × 24.3	April–October 1845
	Farmstead.	Paper, watercolor	16.1 × 24.6	April–October 1845
	On the Oril River (Village).	Paper, pencil	16.7 × 24.3	April–October 1845
	Hamlet in Ukraine	Paper, pencil, watercolor	16.7 × 24.7	April 1845 – April 1846
	On the Oril River.	Paper, pencil	16.4 × 24.8	April–October 1845
	Landscape with Stone Figures.	Paper, pencil	17.1 × 25.7	April–October 1845
	Savior Monastery in Poltava.	Paper, sepia, watercolor, ink	19.1 × 27.1	August 1845
	House of I. P. Kotlyarevsky in Poltava.	Paper, watercolor	16.7 × 24.4	VIII 1845
	In Reshetylivka.	Paper, ink, sepia, watercolor	19 × 27.4	VIII 1845
	In Reshetylivka.	Paper, ink, sepia, watercolor	17.9 × 27.1	VIII 1845
	Portrait of Havrylo Rodzyanko	Paper, watercolor	25.1 × 22.1	24.VII–19.VIII 1845
	Self-Portrait.	Paper, pencil	17 × 13.3	Late August 1845
	Stone Cross of St. Boris.	Paper, watercolor	17.5 × 26.2	VIII–IX 1845
	Portrait of Oleksandr Andriyovych Lukyanovych.	Canvas, oil	67 × 53.5	X 1845
	Portrait of an Unknown Woman in Blue Clothing.	Paper, watercolor		IV 1845–IV 1846
	Portrait of an Unknown Woman in a Lilac Dress.	Paper, watercolor	28.3 × 21.7	IV 1845–1846
	Portrait of a Merchant.	Bristol Board, pencil, watercolor	28.1 × 23	IV 1845–1846
	Tree.	Paper, pencil	30.4 × 23.5	IV 1845–Autumn 1846
	Edge of the Forest.	Paper, pencil, watercolor	23.7 × 32.1	IV 1845–III 1847
	Portrait of Horlenko.	Canvas, oil	44.8 × 37	1846–1847
	Portrait of Andriy Lysohub	Paper, pencil	21.3 × 17	28.II–30.IV 1846; III 1847
	Portrait of Illia Lysohub.	Canvas, oil	65.5 × 53.5	28.II–30.IV 1846; III 1847
	Near Sedniv.	Paper, ink, sepia, watercolor	21.1 × 29.2	IV 1846
	Chumaks Among Burial Mounds	Paper, pencil, watercolor	18.5 × 27	IV 1846
	In Sedniv.	Paper, sepia	18.4 × 26.7	IV 1846
	Portrait of Mariya Fedorivna Katerynych.	Paper, watercolor	30 × 22	18.II–IV 1846
	Portrait of Oleksandr Andriyovych Katerynych	Paper, watercolor	30 × 22.1	18.II–IV 1846
	Portrait of Ivan Andriyovych Katerynych.	Paper, watercolor	30 × 22.1	18.II–IV 1846
	Portrait of Tetiana Panteleimonivna Katerynych.	Paper, watercolor	30 × 22.3	18.II–IV 1846
	Portrait of Olena Antonivna Afendyk.	Paper, watercolor	26.5 × 18.8	18.II–IV 1846
	Church in Kyiv.	Paper, watercolor	25.5 × 34.6	IV–IX 1846
	All Saints Church in the Kyiv Pechersk Lavra	Paper, sepia	27.3 × 36.9	IV–IX 1846
	Askold's Grave.	Sepia, watercolor	26 × 37	IV–IX 1846
	Vasylkiv Fortress in Kyiv.	Paper, pencil, sepia, ink	21.8 × 29.3	IV–IX 1846
	Synagogue.	Paper, sepia	21.5 × 30	IX–X 1846
	Pochaiv Lavra from the South.	Paper, watercolor	28.9 × 37.8	X 1846
	The Pochaiv Lavra from the West.	Paper, watercolor	28.2 × 37.8	X 1846
	Cathedral of the Pochaiv Lavra (Interior View).	Paper, watercolor	37.6 × 28.4	X 1846
	View of the Surroundings from the Terrace of the Pochaiv Lavra.	Paper, watercolor	28.7 × 37.7	X 1846
	Portrait of Yuliya Hryhorivna Srebdolska.	Paper, pencil	25.8 × 19.7	I 1847
	Portrait of Yelyzaveta Vasylivna Keykuatova.	Canvas, oil	66.7 × 56.5	Late III–4.IV 1847

=== Sketchbook 1839–1843 ===
Image	Name	Technique	Size	Year
	Peasants. Sketch of two figures	Colored paper, pencil	17.6 × 26.2	V 1843
	The Blind Woman, Story of Suvorov, Kateryna and other sketches and drafts	Paper, pencil, ink, pen	17.6 × 26.5	1842
	The Wife of Sotnyk. and other sketches	Paper, pencil	17.6 × 26.5	1841–1842
	Story of Suvorov. Sketches and other drafts	Paper, pencil, ink, pen	17.6 × 26.5	1842
	Kateryna, Story of Suvorov and other drafts.	Paper, pencil	17.6 × 26.5	1842
	Weeds. Sketches	Paper, pencil	17.6 × 26.5	Summer 1840
	In Kyiv. Study	Paper, pencil	17.6 × 26.5	V–IX 1843
	Woman on the Ground; Compositional sketch for an unknown work.	Paper, pencil	17.6 × 26.5	May 1843
	History of Suvorov; Sketch and additional drafts	Paper, pencil	17.6 × 26.5	1842–1843
	Maria. Sketch. Horse's Head. Study for the painting Kateryna.	Paper, pencil	17.6 × 26.5	1840–1842
	Peasant Family. Sketch draft	Paper, pencil	17.6 × 26.5	May 1843
	In Kyiv. Study	Paper, pencil	17.6 × 26.5	May–September 1843
	Branch. Sketch	Paper, pencil	17.6 × 26.5	1839–1843
	Trees. Study	Paper, pencil	17.6 × 26.5	May–September 1843
	Strjutschko Cossack Hut.	Paper, pencil	17.6 × 26.5	May 1843
	View of Kyiv.	Paper, pencil	17.6 × 26.5	May–September 1843
	Peasants and Other Sketches.	Paper, pencil	17.6 × 26.5	May 1843
	At the Table. Sketch	Paper, pencil	17.6 × 26.5	1839–1843
	Remote Caves of the Kyiv-Pechersk Lavra. Sketch	Paper, pencil	17.6 × 26.5	May–September 1843
	Back View of a Peasant. Tree. Sketches	Paper, pencil	17.6 × 26.5	May 1843
	Kyiv from the Dnipro and Other Sketches.	Paper, pencil	17.6 × 26.5	May–September 1843
	House by the River.	Paper, pencil	17.6 × 26.5	May–October 1843
	Starosty. (Matchmakers); Studies	Paper, pencil	17.6 × 26.5	May 1843
	Starosty. Studies	Paper, pencil	17.6 × 26.5	May 1843
	Starosty. Studies for an etching and individual sketch	Paper, pencil	17.6 × 26.5	May 1843
	Peasant. Peasant Woman. Building with Plan. Sketches	Paper, pencil	17.6 × 26.5	May 1843
	Council of Judges. Sketch for an etching	Paper, pencil	17.6 × 26.5	May 1843
	Parental Home of T.H. Shevchenko in the Village of Kyrylivka.	Paper, pencil	17.6 × 26.5	September 1843
	Composition on a Historical Theme. Two sketches and a draft drawing.	Paper, pencil	17.6 × 26.5	May 1843
	Composition on a Historical Theme. Sketch	Paper, pencil	17.6 × 26.5	May 1843
	Council of Judges. Sketch for an etching	Paper, pencil	17.6 × 26.5	May 1843
	Fairy Tale. Starosty. Studies	Paper, pencil	17.6 × 26.5	May 1843
	Matchmaker; Study	Paper, pencil	17.6 × 26.5	May 1843
	Matchmaker. Studies	Paper, pencil	17.6 × 26.5	May 1843
	Peasant Family. Study	Paper, pencil	17.6 × 26.5	May 1843
	Landscape with Church. Unfinished sketch	Paper, pencil	17.6 × 26.5	May 1843
	Trees. Sketch	Paper, pencil	17.6 × 26.5	May–September 1843
	Portrait of a Woman; Sketches for a portrait composition and others.	Paper, pencil	17.6 × 26.5	1839–1843
	By the Shore. Sketch	Paper, pencil	17.6 × 26.5	May 1843
	Council of Judges. Sketch	Paper, pencil	17.6 × 26.5	June 13, 1843
	Landscape, Sketches of a Female Figure and a Male Profile.	Paper, pencil	17.6 × 26.5	May 1843
	At an Anatomy Lecture; Sketches	Paper, pencil	17.6 × 26.5	January–July 1841
	Model; Sketches	Paper, pencil	17.6 × 26.5	
	Peasant Family. Sketch	Paper, pencil	17.6 × 26.5	May 1843
	Landscape with River.	Paper, pencil	17.6 × 26.5	May–September 1843
	Peasant Family. The Blind Man (The Slave). Sketches	Paper, pencil	17.6 × 26.5	May 1843
	Sketches.	Colored paper, pencil	17.6 × 26.5	1839–1843

=== Illustrations for History of Suvorov, 1842 ===
Image	Name	Technique	Dimensions	Year
	Suvorov on Guard	Etching	8.5 × 7.5	1842
	The Confederates Demand the Krakow Commander to Surrender Weapons	Etching	11.1 × 9.5	1842
	Suvorov in a Tatar Tent.	Etching	0.4 × 8.7	1842
	The Arrest of Pugachev.	Etching	9.5 × 10.1	1842
	Suvorov Sends Pugachev from Uralisk to Simbirsk.	Etching	6.5 × 10.7	1842
	Suvorov with the Crimean Khan Şahin Giray.	Etching	13 × 11.2	1842
	Suvorov at the Celebration of the Treaty with the Tatars.	Etching	9.5 × 11.2	1842
	Suvorov with Musa-Bey.	Etching	8.4 × 9.2	1842
	The Meeting of Catherine with the Polish King Stanislaus in Kaniów.	Etching	6.8 × 11	1842
	The Wounded Suvorov with Potemkin.	Etching	9.7 × 11	1842
	Prince Coburg greets Suvorov.	Etching	8.5 × 6.5	1842
	The Messenger Informs the Turkish Vizier of Suvorov's Unexpected Attack.	Etching	7.6 × 8.8	1842
	Death of Potemkin.	Etching	7.2 × 11.2	1842
	Suvorov Receives the Envoys of the Polish King Stanislaus.	Etching	7.5 × 8.6	1842
	Abdication of the Polish King Stanislaus.	Etching	7.2 × 9.6	1842
	Suvorov Explains His War Plans to Catherine II.	Etching	10.5 × 9.1	1842
	Suvorov's Farewell to the Soldiers in Tulchyn.	Etching	6.3 × 9	1842
	Suvorov Reads Apostolos in the Church of the Village of Konchanske	Etching	8.5 × 6.6	1842
	Suvorov Plays a Game with Peasant Children.	Etching	8.7 × 8	1842
	Suvorov Receives an Order from Paul I Before the Italian Campaign	Etching	9.2 × 8.5	1842
	King Louis XVIII Greets Suvorov in Mitau Before the Italian Campaign.	Etching	8.5 × 9.8	1842
	Suvorov Refuses to Disclose His Operational Plans to Austrian Prime Minister Thugut.	Etching	8.8 × 8.6	1842
	Cardinals Thank Suvorov for the Victory at Novi.	Etching	8.6 × 8	1842
	Suvorov Tastes Soldiers.' Food	Etching	6.8 × 11.1	1842
	Suvorov Speaks with an Abbot.	Etching	6.7 × 9	1842
	Suvorov in the Tomb Before the Coffin of Austrian Generalissimo Laudon	Etching	9.2 × 7.8	1842
	Suvorov Organizes Entertainment in Prague Following Russian Folk Traditions	Etching	7 × 11	1842
	Artist I. G. Schmidt Paints a Portrait of Suvorov	Etching	9.7 × 8.2	1842
	Suvorov as a Bell-ringer	Etching	8.5 × 6.8	1842
	The Order of Louis XVIII is Presented to the Ill Suvorov	Etching	8.5 × 6.3	1842
	Suvorov in the Last Hours of His Life.	Etching	6.6 × 9	1842
	Suvorov in His Coffin.	Etching	8.6 × 11.1	1842

=== Series of etchings "Picturesque Ukraine", 1844 ===
Image	Name	Technique	Dimensions	Year of Creation
	In Kyiv.	Paper, etching	17.6 × 25.7; 22.3 × 30; 36 × 44.3	III — June 6–7, 1844
	Council of Judges.	Paper, etching	19 × 26.1; 26.1 × 32.1; 42.5 × 63.5	III — May 6–7, 1844
	Gifts in Chyhyryn 1649.	Paper, etching	19.6 × 27.1	III — May 6–7, 1844
	Starosty.	Paper, etching	18 × 25.6; 23.8 × 29.9; 26.8 × 35.2	XI 1844
	Fairy Tale.	Paper, etching	21.6 × 17.7; 25.4 × 20.2; 36.2 × 42	VIII 1844
	Vydubychi Monastery in Kyiv.	Paper, etching	17.1 × 24.2; 20.1 × 26.5; 36.1 × 41	XI 1844

=== Illustrations for Russian Commanders, 1844 ===
Image	Name	Technique	Dimensions	Year of Creation
	Portrait of Peter I.	Etching	14.5 × 12.3	1844
	Portrait of B. P. Sheremetev.	Etching	11.5 × 8.9	1844
	Portrait of A. D. Menshikov.	Etching	11.5 × 9.5	1844
	Portrait of B. C. Minich.	Etching	11.5 × 9.3	1844
	Portrait of P. A. Rumyantsev	Etching	11.5 × 9.8	1844
	Portrait of G. A. Potemkin.	Etching	10.7 × 9.5	1844
	Portrait of A. V. Suvorov.	Etching	11.3 × 10.2	1844
	Portrait of M. I. Golenishchev-Kutuzov.	Etching	11.5 × 10.8	1844
	Portrait of M. B. Barclay de Tolly	Etching	10.5 × 11.5	1844
	Portrait of P. C. Wittgenstein	Etching	11.1 × 9.8	1844
	Portrait of I. I. Diebitsch.	Etching	11.1 × 10	1844
	Portrait of I. F. Paskevich	Etching	13.7 × 12.3	1844

=== Album, 1845 ===
Image	Name	Technique	Dimensions	Year of Creation
	Genre Study.. Sketch.	Paper, pencil	17.5 × 26.9 cm	April 1845
	Genre Study.. Sketch and Drafts.	Paper, pencil	17.5 × 26.9 cm	April – September 1845
	Peasant. Draft.	Paper, pencil	17.5 × 26.9 cm	April 1845
	In Hustynia. Peter and Paul Church.	Paper, watercolor	17.5 × 26.9 cm	April – July 20, 1845
	Gate in Hustynia. St. Nicholas Church.	Paper, watercolor	17.5 × 26.9 cm	April – July 20, 1845
	Farmstead. Draft.	Paper, pencil	17.5 × 26.9 cm	April 1845
	St. Michael's Church in Pereiaslav.	Paper, watercolor	17.5 × 26.9 cm	August – September 1845
	Resurrection Cathedral in Pereiaslav.	Paper, watercolor	17.5 × 26.9 cm	August – September 1845
	Reaper. Draft.	Paper, sepia, ink	17.5 × 26.9 cm	May – October 1845
	Intercession Church in Pereiaslav.	Paper, watercolor	17.5 × 26.9 cm	August – September 1845
	Andrushi.	Paper, sepia	17.5 × 26.9 cm	August – October 1845
	Andrushi.	Paper, sepia	17.5 × 26.9 cm	August – October 1845
	Semantron.	Paper, pencil	17.5 × 26.9 cm	April 1845
	Barn in Potoky.	Paper, watercolor	17.5 × 26.9 cm	Late August 1845
	Stone Crosses in Subotiv.	Paper, sepia	17.5 × 26.9 cm	April – October 1845
	Rural Cemetery.	Paper, watercolor	17.5 × 26.9 cm	April 1845
	Portrait of an Unknown Person. Draft.	Paper, pencil	17.5 × 26.9 cm	April 1845
	Motryn Monastery.	Paper, watercolor	17.5 × 26.9 cm	April – October 1845
	Chyhyryn Convent.	Paper, sepia	17.5 × 26.9 cm	April – October 1845
	Chapel.	Paper, sepia	17.5 × 26.9 cm	April 1845
	Bohdan's Ruins in Subotiv.	Paper, watercolor	17.5 × 26.9 cm	April – October 1845
	Bohdan's Church in Subotiv.	Paper, watercolor	17.5 × 26.9 cm	April – October 1845
	Three Figures. Sketches.	Paper, pencil	17.5 × 26.9 cm	April 1845
	Chyhyryn from the Subotiv Road.	Paper, watercolor	17.5 × 26.9 cm	April – October 1845
	Flood.	Paper, watercolor	17.5 × 26.9 cm	April 1845
	Human Figure. Sketch.	Paper, pencil	17.5 × 26.9 cm	April 1845
	In Vyunyshche	Paper, sepia	17.5 × 26.9 cm	August – October 1845
	In Hustynia. Refectory Church.	Paper, watercolor	17.5 × 26.9 cm	April – July 20, 1845
	Farmstead. Sketch.	Paper, pencil	17.5 × 26.9 cm	April 1845
	On the Edge.	Paper, watercolor	17.5 × 26.9 cm	Summer 1845
	Porridge Cooker. Sketch.	Paper, pencil	17.5 × 26.9 cm	1845
	In Vasylyvka.	Paper, watercolor	17.5 × 26.9 cm	October 1845
	Peasants. Figures. Sketches.	Paper, pencil	17.5 × 26.9 cm	April 1845
	Kobzar and Other Sketches.	Paper, pencil	17.5 × 26.9 cm	April 1845

=== Studies, sketches, and drawings from 1837–1847 ===
Image	Name	Technique	Dimensions (cm)	Year of Creation
	Hand. Study for the portrait of J. P. Hrebinka	Bristol board, pencil	21.3 × 18.8	1837
	Horse. Sketch	Paper, pencil	23.3 × 34	December 25, 1838
	Poplar. Study	Colored paper, pencil	25.7 × 20	1839
	Portrait of A. I. Lahoda. Sketch	Paper, pencil	25.2 × 19.6	1839
	In the Life Drawing Class at the Art Academy and Other Sketches.	Paper, pencil	21.7 × 28.7	1839–1842
	In the Life Drawing Class at the Art Academy; Sketches	Paper, pencil	21.8 × 28.7	1839–1842
	Head of a Plaster Statue of a Child. Plaster Hand. Model Stepan. Sketches	Paper, pencil	21.8 × 28.7	1839–1842
	Models and Students of the Art Academy. Sketches	Paper, pencil	21.7 × 28.7	1839–1842
	Sleeping Woman and Other Sketches.	Paper, pencil	21.7 × 28.7	1839–1842
	Art Academy Students at the Easel and Composition Sketch.	Paper, pencil	17.8 × 26.3	1839–1842
	Model and Students of the Art Academy.	Paper, pencil	17.8 × 26.3	1839–1842
	Art Academy Students and Other Sketches.	Paper, pencil	17.8 × 26.3	1839–1842
	In the Life Drawing Room of the Art Academy; Sketches	Paper, pencil	17.8 × 26.3	1839–1842
	Portrait of a Woman. Sketches	Paper, pencil	13.3 × 9.7	1839–1843
	Portrait of a Woman with Curls.	Paper, pencil	13.8 × 10.2	1839–1843
	Seated Woman. Sketch	Paper, pencil	15 × 13	1839–1843
	Person by the Shore. Sketch	Paper, pencil	9 × 8.8	1839–1843
	Genre Scene. Sketch	Paper, pencil	11.1 × 14	1840–1843
	The Drowned Woman. Boy with a Dog. Narcissus and Other Sketches and Drawings	Paper, pencil	17.8 × 26.5	1840–1841
	Sketches on a Letter to His Brother, M. H. Shevchenko.	Paper, ink, pen	25 × 19.7	March 2, 1840
	Oak Branch. Sketches	Paper, pencil	21.5 × 17.8	1840–1842
	Miss Sotnykivna. Sketch	Paper, pencil	22.3 × 31	December 1841–November 1842
	Sleeve of a Woman's Shirt; Studies	Paper, pencil	22.3 × 31	December 1841–November 1842
	Woman in Sarafan, Old Man and Other Sketches.	Paper, pencil	27.5 × 19.2	1841–1842
	Catholic Monk. Sketch for an illustration to the work Willpower by M. I. Nadzhodin	Bristol paper, pencil	14 × 11.3	April 30, 1841
	Sketches of illustrations for the work Willpower by M. I. Nadzhodin.	Bristol paper, pencil	14 × 11.3	April 30, 1841
	By the Sickbed.	Paper, pencil	15.9 × 21.4	October 10, 1841
	Sketches in the margins of the manuscript of the poem Mariana the Nun.	Paper, ink, pen	20.5 × 12.9, 20.4 × 12.8, 20.4 × 12.7, 20.3 × 12.8	November 22, 1841
	Old Man. Study for the Painting 'Kateryna' and Other Studies and Sketches.	Paper, pencil	26.4 × 36.5	December 1841–1842
	Suvorov in His Final Hours and Other Sketches.	Paper, pencil	18 × 26	1842–1843
	The Blind Woman, The Story of Suvorov. Sketches and Drawings	Paper, pencil, sepia, ink, pen	26.4 × 36.5	1842
	Oksana; Sketch for a self-illustration to the poem The Blind Woman.	Paper, ink, pencil	23.3 × 14.4	1842
	Oksana; Sketch for a self-illustration to the poem The Blind Woman.	Paper, Red Pencil	18.9 × 15.7	1842
	Interrogation of Prisoners. Illustration for the poem Voinarovsky by Kondraty Ryleyev. Sketch and Drawings	Paper, pencil	18.2 × 26.3	1842
	Artist at the Easel and Other Sketches and Drawings	Paper, pencil	18.2 × 26.3	1842
	Anatomical Drawing.	Paper, watercolor	26.3 × 36.6	Winter 1842
	Death of Bohdan Khmelnytsky. Sketches	Paper, pencil	26.3 × 36.6	1842–1843
	Death of Bohdan Khmelnytsky. Sketch	Paper, pencil	25.6 × 33.7	1842–1843
	Death of Bohdan Khmelnytsky. Sketch	Paper, pencil	25.6 × 33.7	1842–1843
	In the Harem. Sketch	Paper, pencil	16.2 × 18	1843
	In the Harem. Sketch	Paper, pencil	17.6 × 23.2	1843
	In the Harem; Watercolor sketch and separate drawing	Paper, pencil	17.6 × 23.2	May 1843
	Kateryna. Painting sketch	Paper, pencil, ink, pen	25.2 × 20	January 25, 1843
	Anton Holovaty by the Neva. Sketch	Paper, pencil	18.9 × 12.7	May 1843
	Composition on a Historical Theme. Sketch	Paper, pencil	5.5 × 4.7, 18.9 × 12.7	May 1843
	Composition on a Historical Theme. Sketch	Paper, pencil	33.3 × 23.1	May 1843
	Portrait of a Youth. By the Well. By the Bed. Sketches	Paper, pencil	23 × 16.3	1843
	Portrait of a Youth. Hands. Sketch and Studies	Paper, pencil	19.4 × 26.4	1843
	Hand with a Shako Cover. Study	Paper, pencil	14.5 × 24	1843
	Kyiv from the Dnipro Side.	Paper, pencil	27.7 × 38.3	May–September 1843
	Architectural Landscape. Drawing	Paper, pencil	27.7 × 38.3	May 1843
	Kyiv Mezhyhirya Monastery.	Paper, pencil	28.4 × 40.1	June 1843
	On the Apiary. "The Blind Man" ("The Prisoner"). At the Well. Sketches	Paper, pencil	26.2 × 37.4	May 1843
	Figure. Head of an Old Man. Drawings	Paper, pencil	26.2 × 37.4	May 1843
	On the Apiary. Studies	Paper, pencil	14.8 × 11.9	May 1843
	Woman on the Ground. Sketches	Paper, pencil	14.5 × 23.5	May 1843
	Maenad. Sketches	Paper, pencil	10 × 19.4	May 1843
	Maenad. Sketches	Paper, pencil	15.7 × 16.2	May 1843
	Gifts in Chyhyryn 1649. Sketches	Paper, pencil	10 × 19.4	May 1843 – January 1844
	Court Councillor. Study	Paper, pencil	15.7 × 16.2	May 1843 – January 1844
	The Blind Man (The Prisoner); Sketch	Paper, pencil	22.7 × 18.4	23–26 November 1843
	In Kyiv.	Paper, pencil	18.3 × 27	March–April 1844
	Landscape; Drawing	Paper, pencil	16.7 × 24.7	April 1845 – April 1846
	Yard in a Village	Paper, pencil	12.7 × 20.9	Summer 1845
	Portrait of an Elderly Woman with a Boy.	Paper, pencil	25 × 22	1845–1846
	Portrait of an Unknown Man.	Bristol paper, watercolor	22.6 × 22.8	April 1845 – April 1846
	Two Women. Trees. Drawings	Paper, pencil	24 × 29.7	April 1845 – April 1846
	Trees. Drawing	Paper, pencil	24 × 29.7	April 1845 – April 1846
	Stinka Nature Reserve.	Paper, pencil	17 × 24.2	May–October 1845
	Bilyk Nature Reserve.	Paper, pencil	16.6 × 24.5	May–October 1845
	In Ukraine.	Paper, pencil	16.9 × 24	Summer 1845
	Genre Scene. Drawing	Paper, pencil	17.5 × 26.2	August–September 1845
	Drawings on the Pages of the Manuscript Collection Three Years.	Paper, pencil	32.3 × 21	Late 1845 – Early 1847
	Drawings on the Pages of the Manuscript Collection Three Years.	Paper, pencil	32.3 × 21	Late 1845 – Early 1847
	Drawings on the Pages of the Manuscript Collection Three Years.	Paper, pencil	32.3 × 21	Late 1845 – Early 1847
	Drawings on the Pages of the Manuscript Collection Three Years.	Paper, pencil	32.3 × 21	Late 1845 – Early 1847
	Pottery from the Church of the Village of Mokhnatyn.	Paper, pencil	20 × 19.2	February–April 1846
	Bowl of the Hustynia Monastery.	Paper, pencil	20 × 18.9	February–April 1846
	Encolpion.	Paper, pencil	28 × 19.3	February–April 1846
	Kytaivska Hermitage. Trinity Church. Drawing	Paper, pencil	19.8 × 28.6	April–September 1846
	Landscape. Drawing	Paper, pencil	19.8 × 28.6	April–September 1846
	Vyshhorod. Drawing	Paper, pencil	27 × 39	April–September 1846
	At the Meal.	Paper, pencil	14.9 × 22.8	July–August 1846
	Landscape. Drawing	Paper, pencil	14.9 × 22.8	July–August 1846
	Young Man with a Pipe, Head of a Peasant, and Boy with a Rake; Drawings	Paper, pencil	20.3 × 28	July–August 1846
	Peasant with a Hat. Drawing	Paper, pencil	20.3 × 28	July–August 1846
	Peasant Figures. Drawings	Paper, pencil	20.4 × 30.2	July–August 1846
	Group of Peasants and Other Drawings.	Paper, pencil	24 × 31.8	July–August 1846
	Rural Buildings. Drawings	Paper, pencil	24 × 31.8	July–August 1846
	Drawings on the Margin of the Manuscript Poem The Mermaid.	Paper, pencil	22 × 17.7	9 August 1846
	Pochaiv Lavra from the West; Drawing	Paper, pencil	28.9 × 37.8	October 1846
	Cathedral of the Pochaiv Lavra (Interior View). Sketch	Paper, pencil	37.6 × 28.4	October 1846
	The Witch. Drawing for the Poem of the Same Name by T. Shevchenko.	Paper, pencil	9.4 × 7	March 1847
	Children of M. I. Keikutatov.	Paper, pencil	24 × 24	Late March – 4 April 1847
	Children of M. I. Keikutatov. Drawing	Paper, pencil	24 × 24	Late March – 4 April 1847

=== Doubtful ===
Image	Name	Technique	Dimensions	Year
	Portrait of the Father.	Paper, ink, pen, brush	(13.8 × 5)	1829–1830
	Portrait of K. P. Briullov.	Paper, pencil	15.6 × 11.7	1835
	Crusade under the Leadership of Peter the Hermit. Sketches and drawings	Paper, pencil	23.1 × 32	1838
	Narcissus; Sketch and study	Paper, pencil	17.8 × 26.3	1840
	Mother washing a child. The Sacrifice of Abraham and a multi-figure composition. Sketches	Paper, pencil, watercolor	17.8 × 26.3	1840
	Tree; Drawing	Paper, pencil	34.4 × 24.6	1839–1843
	Boy with Dog in the Forest. Sketch	Paper, pencil	3.4 × 4.0; 25 × 35.5	1840
	Portraits of P. I. and N. O. Saporoshnikov.	Paper, pencil	21.5 × 28	1840–1842
	Portrait of O. O. Agin.	Canvas, oil	37.7 × 29.4	1840–1844
	Hamaliya.	Canvas, oil	30 × 28	1842
	Portrait of Petro Dunin-Borkovsky.	Canvas, oil	37.2 × 30.5	–

==== Missing works ====
Name	Technique	Year of Creation
Copies of paintings of the Suzdal school	Paper, pencil	1829–1832
Portrait of Platov. Copy.	Paper, pencil	6 Dec 1829
Saturn	Paper, pencil	1835
Apollo Belvedere	Paper, pencil	1835
Heraclitus 1	Paper, pencil	1835
Heraclitus	Paper, pencil	1835
Architectural bas-reliefs	Paper, pencil	1835–1836
Mask of Fortunata	Paper, pencil	1835–1836
Portraits of Ivan Nechyporenko	Paper, watercolor	1835–1837
Female portraits	–	1835–1837
Skeleton	–	1835–1837
Farnese Hercules	–	1836
Apollino. Copy.	–	1836
Painting of the Great Theatre in Petersburg	–	1836
Mask of Laocoön	–	1836–1837
Copy of a work by Michelangelo	–	1836–1837
Head of Lucius Verus	–	1836–1837
Head of a "Genius"	–	1836–1837
Anatomical figures	–	1836–1837
Germanicus	–	1836–1837
Dancing faun	–	1836–1837
Portrait of Demidov's fiancée	–	1837
Anatomical statue by Fischer	–	1837–1838
Midas, hanged by Apollo	–	1837–1838
Oedipus, Antigone and Polynices. Drawing on the tragedy "Oedipus in Athens" by Ozerov	Paper, pencil	1837–1838
Ezekiel on the bone-covered field. Sketch.	–	Sep 1838–Dec 1839
Portrait of I.A. Krylov	–	1838–1840
Portrait of Pyotr Ivanovich Martos	Paper, watercolor	1839
Drawing from nature	–	29 Apr 1839
Portrait of Solovaya	–	Autumn 1839
Model Taras Mikhailovich Malyshev. Studies.	–	1839–1842
Portrait of S.S. Hulak-Artemovsky	Paper, watercolor	1840
Birch trees. Spruces. Studies.	–	Summer 1840
Beggar boy giving bread to a dog (oil) and sketch for this painting	–	27 Sep 1840
Drawings on a letter to H.F. Kvitka-Osnovyanenko	–	1840–1841
Portrait of Demsky	Paper, pencil	1841
Portrait of Vasily Petrovich Aprelev	–	1841
Group of sleeping beggar women	Paper, watercolor	26 Sep 1842
Painting by Shevchenko that belonged to Skobelev	Oil	1842
"Miss Sotnykivna"	–	1842
King Lear. Drawing on the theme of the eponymous tragedy by Shakespeare	Paper, sepia	10 Feb 1843
Portraits of Shevchenko's acquaintances	–	June 1843–1844
Ball at the Volkhovsky family	Paper, watercolor	29 Jun 1843; 12 Jan 1844; 12 Jan 1846
Portrait of A. Volkhovsky	Oil	29 Jun 1843; 12 Jan 1844; 12 Jan 1846
Painting for Yesutchevsky	–	Mar 1845
Self-portrait of T.H. Shevchenko with candle	–	1845
Portrait of Mariya Stepanovna Kosachkovska	Paper, watercolor	Aug 1845
House of A.O. Kosachkovsky in Pereyaslav	–	Aug–Oct 1845
House of Khmelnytskyi in Subotiv	–	20 Oct 1845
Portraits of family members of Oleksandr Andriyovych Lukyanovych	–	Oct 1845
Self-portrait	–	Dec 1845
Portrait of Shostka Oleksandra Ivanivna	Oil	12 Jan 1846
Ball in Chernihiv. Illustration to a poem by Chuzhbinsky. Sketch and drawing.	Paper, pencil	Feb 1846
Portrait of O.S. Afanasiev-Chuzhbinsky	Paper, pencil	Feb–Apr 1846
Three portraits of family members of the Katerynych family	Paper, watercolor	Spring 1846
Views of Kyiv, works by T.H. Shevchenko that were in the possession of I.I. Funduklei	–	Apr–Sep 1846
Kyiv garden	Pencil	Apr–Sep 1846
Golden Gate	–	Summer 1846
Caves of the Kyiv Pechersk Lavra	–	Jan 1846
Hermits	–	Apr–Sep 1846
Portrait of a hermit-ataman	–	Summer 1846
Drawings by T. Shevchenko that were in the possession of M.M. Sashin	–	9 Jan 1847
Portrait of Viktor Nikolaevich Zabila	Paper, pencil	End of Jan–Feb 1847
Portrait of the son of K.I. Bilozerskyi	Paper, pencil	Jan–Feb 1847
Portrait of Y.H. Srebdolskaya	Paper, pencil	Jan 1847
Christ blesses the bread. St. Demetrius. Double-sided icon on metal.	Oil	End of Mar–4 Apr 1847

== Paintings and graphics, 1847–1850 ==
=== Works from 1847–1850 ===
Image	Title	Medium	Dimensions	Date
	Self-portrait.	paper, pencil	12.7 × 9.9	23.VI–XII 1847
	Fire in the Steppe.	paper, watercolor	21.4 × 29.6	12.V 1848
	Transport Camp in the Steppe.	paper, watercolor	13.9 × 22.5	11.V–17.VI 1848
	Fort Qarabutaq.	paper, watercolor	20.4 × 29.5	21.V 1848–15.I 1850
	Fort Qarabutaq.	paper, sepia	13.3 × 22.8	21.V 1848–15.I 1850
	Dzhangys-Agach	paper, watercolor	13.6 × 22.4	26.V 1848
	Dustanowa Tomb.	paper, watercolor	13.5 × 22.7	27.V 1848–15.I 1850
	Fortress Irgis-Kala.	Paper, watercolor	20 × 29.5	28–30.V 1848–15.I 1850
	Noon Rest of the Expedition Transport in the Steppe.	Paper, watercolor	13.8 × 22.8	V–VI 1848
	Fort Raim. View from the Wharf to the Syr Darya.	Paper, watercolor	20.5 × 29.8	19.VI–25.VII 1848
	Raim from the West.	Paper, watercolor	13.6 × 22.7	19.VI–25.VII 1848
	Fortress Raim. Interior View.	Paper, sepia	15.8 × 31.3	19.VI–25.VII 1848
	T. H. Shevchenko Drawing a Comrade.	Paper, sepia	18.1 × 27.1	19.VI–25.VII 1848
	Portrait of an Unknown Man with a Guitar.	Paper, sepia	17.9 × 14	19.VI–25.VII 1848; I–III 1849
	Kazakh People in a Yurt.	Paper, sepia	?	19.VI-25.VII 1848; I-III 1849
	Dock at Syr-Darya in 1848.	Paper, watercolor	13 × 22.8	20.VI-25.VII 1848
	Brig "Konstantin" and "Mikhail"	Paper, sepia, White Highlighting	16.8 × 26.7	20–25.VIII 1848
	Equipment of the Brig.	Toned Paper, sepia	15.9 × 30.5	19.VI-25.VII 1848
	Equipment of the Brig.	Toned Paper, sepia	15.6 × 30.2	19.VI-25.VII 1848
	Island Kug-Aral.	Toned Paper, watercolor	13.9 × 22.9	1–2.VIII 1848; IX 1849
	South Coast of Kulandy Peninsula.	Toned Paper, watercolor	13.2 × 22.6	4–16.VIII, 10–11.IX 1848; 25–28.VII 1849
	Grave of Mulla-Dosa-Mal on Kulandy Peninsula.	Toned Paper, watercolor	13.5 × 22.8	4–16.VIII, 10–11.IX 1848; 25–28.VII 1849
	Expedition Tent on Barsa-Kelmes Island	Paper, watercolor	13.3 × 22.9	7–13.VIII 1848
	Cape Bai-Gubek.	Paper, watercolor	13.6 × 22.8	20.VIII 1848
	Cape Bai-Gubek.	Paper, watercolor	13.8 × 22.7	20.VIII 1848
	Steep Shore of the Aral Sea	Paper, watercolor	16 × 28.5	VIII 1848-IX 1849
	Mountain Shore of Nikolai Island.	Paper, watercolor	15.6 × 29.1	12–21.IX 1848; 22–30.VIII 1849
	Shore of Nikolai Island.	Paper, watercolor	13.8 × 22.9	12–21 Sep 1848; 22–30 Aug 1849
	Low Shore of Nikolai Island.	Paper, watercolor	15.3 × 28.7	12–21 Sep 1848; 22–30 Aug 1849
	Shore of Nikolai Island.	Paper, watercolor	13.5 × 22.6	12–21 Sep 1848; 22–30 Aug 1849
	T. H. Shevchenko among Expedition Members on the Shore of the Aral Sea.	Paper, watercolor	13.7 × 22.9	12–21 Sep 1848; 22–30 Aug 1849
	On the Shore of the Aral Sea.	Paper, watercolor	15.3 × 28.7	12–21 Sep 1848; 22–30 Aug 1849
	Schooner near Fort Kos-Aral.	Paper, watercolor	20.6 × 30	6.X 1848–6.V 1849
	Moonlit Night on Kos-Aral.	Paper, watercolor	15 × 29.2	6.X 1848–6.V 1849
	Kazakh Camp on Kos-Aral.	Paper, watercolor	13.7 × 22.7	6.X 1848–6.V 1849
	Fort Kos-Aral in Winter.	Paper, sepia	15.9 × 30.2	6.X 1848–2.IV 1849
	Fort Kos-Aral in Winter.	Paper, sepia, white highlights	15.9 × 30.7	20.XI 1848–2.IV 1849
	Kazakh Boy Lighting a Stove.	Paper, sepia	24.7 × 18.3	6.X 1848–2.IV 1849
	Kazakh Boy Dozing by the Stove.	Paper, sepia	23.3 × 18.1	6.X 1848–2.IV 1849
	Kazakhs by the Fire.	Paper, pencil, sepia	23 × 17.6	6.X 1848–2.IV 1849
	Tiger.	Toned paper, watercolor	15.6 × 31	20.XI 1848
	A. Butakov and Feldsher A. Istomin during the wintering on Kos-Aral.	Paper, sepia	18 × 27.3	20.XI 1848–6.V 1849
	Kazakh on horseback.	Paper, watercolor	20.7 × 28	1848–1849
	Schooner "Konstantin" under repair.	Paper, sepia	9.4 × 18.1	IV 1849
	Island Chykita-Aral.	Paper, watercolor	?	17.V 1849
	Island Chekan-Aral.	Paper, watercolor	14.9 × 28.6	17–19.V 1849
	Self-portrait.	Paper, sepia	24.3 × 18.1	29.XI 1849
	Self-portrait.	Paper, sepia	15.6 × 12.9	XI 1849–IV 1850
	Portrait of Khoma Verner.	Paper, sepia	29.5 × 22.7	1849
	Portrait of A.S. Blaramberg.	Toned paper, watercolor	27.9 × 22	XI 1849–IV 1850
	Portrait of an unknown woman.	Paper, watercolor	26.5 × 9.5	XI 1849–IV 1850
	Portrait of brothers F.M. and M.M. Lazarevsky.	Paper, sepia	29 × 22	11.XII 1849
	Self-portrait.	Paper, sepia	16.2 × 13	29.XII 1849
	Portrait of A.V. Plemannikov.	Paper, watercolor	29.5 × 22.3	I–IV 1850
	Portrait of M. Isaiev.	Paper, watercolor	25.6 × 20.5	II 1850
	Crucifixion. Sketch	Paper, sepia	19.6 × 11.8	III 1850

=== Albums 1846–1850 ===
Image	Title	Technique	Dimensions	Year
	Kazakh in a yurt. Peasant. Drawings	Paper, pencil	11.9 × 17.3	VII–VIII 1846; VI–VII 1848; I–III 1849
	Kazakh in a yurt. Caricatures and other drawings	Paper, pencil, ink, pen	11.9 × 17.3	1846–1850
	Burial mound Perepjat and other drawings.	Paper, pencil	11.9 × 17.3	1846–1850
	Kazakhs. Composition sketch	Paper, pencil	11.9 × 17.3	6.X 1848–2.IV 1849
	Church with bell tower. Drawing	Paper, pencil	11.9 × 17.3	1846
	Kazakh with cap.	Paper, pencil	11.9 × 17.3	6.X 1848–2.IV 1849
	Woman in armchair. Dog sketches.	Paper, pencil	11.9 × 17.3	1846–1849
	Family portrait. Composition sketch	Paper, pencil	11.9 × 17.3	1846–1849
	Expedition camp. Camels. Drawings	Paper, pencil	11.9 × 17.3	11 May – 17 June 1848
	Camel. Drawing	Paper, pencil	11.9 × 17.3	11 May – 17 June 1848
	Loaded camel. Drawing	Paper, pencil	11.9 × 17.3	11 May – 17 June 1848
	Loaded camels. Drawings	Paper, pencil	11.9 × 17.3	11 May – 17 June 1848
	Figure of a well-fed Kazakh. Camels. Drawings	Paper, pencil	11.9 × 17.3	11 May – 17 June 1848
	Caravan in the steppe. Drawing	Paper, pencil	11.9 × 17.3	11 May – 17 June 1848
	Expedition camp in the steppe. Drawing	Paper, pencil	11.9 × 17.3	11 May – 17 June 1848
	Tents of the expedition camp and other drawings.	Paper, pencil	11.9 × 17.3	11 May – 17 June 1848
	Kazakh on camel. Camel. Drawings	Paper, pencil	11.9 × 17.3	May 1848 – October 1849
	Horses. Drawings	Paper, pencil	11.9 × 17.3	May 1848 – October 1849
	Kazakh weaver woman. Drawing	Paper, pencil	11.9 × 17.3	6 October 1848 – 5 May 1849
	Man on the deck of the shallop. Sketches	Paper, pencil	11.9 × 17.3	30 July 1848 – 22 September 1849
	Kazakh boy lighting a stove. Sketches	Paper, pencil	11.9 × 17.3	6 Oct 1848 – 2 Apr 1849
	Judith with the head of Holofernes. Composition sketches	Paper, ink, pen	11.9 × 17.3	1846–1850
	Shore of the Aral Sea. Sketch	Paper, pencil	11.9 × 17.3	Jul, Sep 1849
	On the shore of the Aral Sea. Sketch	Paper, pencil	11.9 × 17.3	Jul, Sep 1849
	On the shore of the Aral Sea. Sketch	Paper, pencil	11.9 × 17.3	Jul, Sep 1849
	Ak-Dzhulpas.	Paper, pencil	11.9 × 17.3	Jul, Sep 1849
	Camels. Horse. Sketches	Paper, pencil	11.9 × 17.3	May 1848 – Oct 1849
	Family portrait. Composition sketch	Paper, pencil	11.9 × 17.3	1846–1849
	Kazakh horseman and other sketches.	Paper, pencil	11.9 × 17.3	May 1848 – Oct 1849
	Kazakh horseman. Figure of a Kazakh. Sketches	Paper, pencil	11.9 × 17.3	May 1848 – Oct 1849
	Expedition camp. Sketches	Paper, pencil	11.9 × 17.3	11 May – 17 Jun 1848
	Portrait of an Unknown Man	Paper, pencil	11.9 × 17.3	1846–1847
	Facade of a Church. Sketch	Paper, pencil	11.9 × 17.3	1846–1847
	Kazakhs and Other Sketches.	Paper, pencil	11.9 × 17.3	May 1848 – Oct. 1849
	Female Faces. Camel Head. Sketches	Paper, pencil	11.9 × 17.3	1846–1850
	Woman. Sketch	Paper, pencil	11.9 × 17.3	1848
	Woman with Raised Arms. Female Clothing. Sketches	Paper, pencil	11.9 × 17.3	1846–1848
	Peasant Clothing. Sketches	Paper, pencil	11.9 × 17.3	1846
	Interior View of the Saint Sophia Cathedral in Kyiv. Sketch	Paper, pencil	11.9 × 17.3	1846
	Expedition Camp. Sketch	Paper, pencil	11.9 × 17.3	11 May – 17 June 1848
	Peasants. Man on a Log. Sketches	Paper, pencil	11.9 × 17.3	1846; 1848–1849
	Peasant with raised hand. On the deck of the shallop. Sketches	Paper, pencil	11.9 × 17.3	1846–1850
	Peasant with spoon. Peasant clothing. Sketches	Paper, pencil	11.9 × 17.3	1846
	Peasants. Sketches	Paper, pencil	11.9 × 17.3	1846
	Peasants. Sketches	Paper, pencil	11.9 × 17.3	1846
	Plan of a central-domed church. Sketch	Paper, pencil	11.9 × 17.3	1846 – IV 1847
	Rural landscape.	Paper, pencil	11.9 × 17.3	1846
	Peasant. Sketch	Paper, pencil	11.9 × 17.3	1846
	Head of a Man. Village Musicians. Sketches	Paper, pencil	11.9 × 17.3	1846 – IV 1847
	Camel and Composition Sketch.	Paper, pencil	11.9 × 17.3	1848–1850
	Peasants. Sketches	Paper, pencil	11.9 × 17.3	1846
	Building with Plan, Sailboats; Shore of the Aral Sea and Other Sketches.	Paper, pencil	11.9 × 17.3	1846 – IX 1849
	Peasant Listening to a Kobzar. Selene and Endymion. Sketches	Paper, pencil	11.9 × 17.3	1846 – IV 1850
	Selene and Endymion. Sketch	Paper, pencil	11.9 × 17.3	VI 1848–1849
	Selene and Endymion. Man in Uniform. Sketch and draft	Paper, pencil	11.9 × 17.3	VI 1848–1849
	Lot with His Daughters. Potter's Daughter from Chios. Sketch drafts	Paper, pencil	11.9 × 17.3	VI 1848–1849
	Water Lilies. Sketch	Paper, pencil	11.9 × 17.3	1846 – IV 1850
	Mountainous Shores of the Aral Sea. Sketches	Paper, pencil	11.9 × 17.3	VI 1848 – IX 1849
	Shores of the Aral Sea. Sketches	Paper, pencil	11.9 × 17.3	VI 1848 – IX 1849
	Clouds Over the Shores of the Aral Sea. Sketch	Paper, pencil	11.9 × 17.3	VI 1848 – IX 1849
	Views of the Mountainous Shores of the Aral Sea. Sketches	Paper, pencil	11.9 × 17.3	VI 1848 – IX 1849
	Mountainous Shores of the Aral Sea. Sketches	Paper, pencil	11.9 × 17.3	VI 1848 – IX 1849
	Female Busts. Sketches	Paper, pencil	11.9 × 17.3	1846 – IV 1850
	Dancing on the Deck of a Shallop. Composition sketch	Paper, pencil	11.9 × 17.3	22.IX 1848; 22.IX 1849
	Mountainous Shore of the Aral Sea, Boats. Sketches	Paper, pencil	11.9 × 17.3	VI 1848 – IX 1849
	Mountainous Shore of the Aral Sea. Sailboat. Shallop. Sketches	Paper, pencil	11.9 × 17.3	VI 1848 – IX 1849
	Shallops and Boats. Sketches	Paper, pencil	11.9 × 17.3	VI 1848 – IX 1849
	Self-Portrait.	Paper, pencil	11 × 17.7	21.X 1848
	Group of Kazakhs and Expedition Members on the Shore of the Aral Sea. Sketch	Paper, pencil	11.9 × 17.3	VI 1848 – IX 1849
	Family Portrait. Self-Portrait. Sketch drafts	Paper, pencil	11.9 × 17.3	1846 – IV 1850
	Kazakh Woman Over a Mortar. Sketch draft	Paper, pencil	11.9 × 17.3	VI 1848–1849
	Winter Buildings of the Aral Sea Expedition. Sketch	Paper, pencil	11.9 × 17.3	IX 1848 — IX 1849
	Family by the House. Sketch draft	Paper, pencil	11.9 × 17.3	1846 — IV 1850
	Bay of the Aral Sea. Sketch	Paper, pencil	11.9 × 17.3	VI 1848 — IX 1849
	Saigas.	Paper, pencil	11.9 × 17.3	12 — 22.IX 1848
	Schooner Under Sail. Sketch	Paper, pencil	11.9 × 17.3	VI 1848 — IX 1849
	Coast of the Aral Sea. Sail. Sketches	Paper, pencil	11.9 × 17.3	VI 1848 — IX 1849
	On the Deck of a Schooner. Sailboat. Schooner by the Shore. Sketches	Paper, pencil	11.9 × 17.3	VI 1848 — IX 1849
	Clouds. Sketches	Paper, pencil	11.9 × 17.3	1846 — IV 1850
	Family Portrait. Scene of Unknown Content. Sketch drafts	Paper, pencil	11.9 × 17.3	1846 — IV 1850
	On the Deck of a Schooner. Daughter of a Potter from Chios. Sketch and draft	Paper, pencil	11.9 × 17.3	VI 1848 — IX 1849
	On the Coast of the Aral Sea. Sketches	Paper, pencil	11.9 × 17.3	VI 1848 — IX 1849
	Oxen. Sketches	Paper, pencil	11.9 × 17.3	V 1848 — X 1849

=== Studies, sketches, and drafts from 1847–1850 ===
Image	Name	Technique	Dimensions	Year of Creation
	By the Deceased. Sketch	Toned paper, pencil	19.4 × 22.5	7.III 1848 — 12.VI 1856
	Settlement in the Steppe. Horse. Sketch drafts	Paper, pencil	14.8 × 23	VI 1848 — X 1849
	Waterless Sands.	Toned paper, pencil	16 × 29	VIII 1848 — IX 1849
	Fire in the Steppe. Sketch	Paper, pencil	14.8 × 23.2	12.V 1848
	Fort Qarabutaq.	Paper, pencil	15 × 23.4	21.V 1848
	Expedition Camp in the Steppe.	Paper, pencil	14.7 × 23.2	26.V — 1.VI 1848
	The Grave of Dustan.	Paper, pencil	15.1 × 23.2	27.V 1848
	Fortress Yrghiz-Kala.	Paper, pencil	14.7 × 23.2	28 — 30.V 1848
	Ak-Kuduk.	Paper, pencil	14.7 × 23.1	V — VI 1848
	Ak-Kuduk. Sketch	Paper, pencil	14.7 × 23.1	V — VI 1848
	Fortress Raïm.	Colored paper, pencil	16.3 × 29.3	19.VI — 25.VII 1848
	Island Kug-Aral.	Paper, pencil	15.2 × 23.2	1 — 2.VIII 1848; IX 1849
	Tyube-Koran.	Paper, pencil	15 × 23.2	3.VIII 1848
	Isendy-Aral.	Toned paper, pencil	15.9 × 29	4–16.VIII, 10–11.IX 1848; 25.VII 1849
	Cape Isendy-Aral.	Paper, pencil	15.1 × 23.3	4–16.VIII, 10–11.IX 1848; 25.VII 1849
	On the Kulandy Peninsula.	Toned paper, pencil	15.7 × 29.4	4–16.VIII, 10–11.IX 1848; 25–28.VII 1849
	Barsakelmes.	Paper, pencil	15 × 23.3	7–13.VIII 1848
	Adzhi-Bai.	Toned paper, pencil	16 × 29.2	22.VIII 1848
	Urgun-Murun.	Toned paper, pencil	15.8 × 28.9	23.VIII 1848
	Mountainous Coast of the Aral Sea.	Toned paper, pencil	15.8 × 29.4	30.VII-23.IX 1848; 6.V-22.IX 1849
	Rocky Coast of the Aral Sea,	Toned paper, pencil	15.8 × 29.3	30.VII-23.IX 1848; 6.V-22.IX 1849
	Steep Coast of the Aral Sea.	Toned paper, pencil	16 × 28.8	30.VII-23.IX 1848; 6.V-22.IX 1849
	Rocks.	Toned paper, pencil	16.1 × 9.6	30.VII-23.IX 1848; 6.V-22.IX 1849
	Kyzyl-Dzhar.	Toned paper, pencil	16.2 × 29.6	VIII 1848; IX 1849
	Kyzyl-Dzhar.	Toned paper, pencil	16.1 × 29.7	VIII 1848; IX 1849
	Kyzyl-Dzhar.	Toned paper, pencil	15.8 × 29.3	VIII 1848; IX 1849
	Western Coast of Kulandy Peninsula.	Paper, pencil	14.8 × 23	11.IX 1848
	Mountainous Coast of Nikolai Island.	Toned paper, pencil	15.7 × 28.9	12–21.IX 1848; 22–30.VIII 1849
	Kuyan-Suyuk.	Toned paper, pencil	15.1 × 30.3	12–21.IX 1848; 22-30.VIII 1849
	Shore of the Aral Sea.	Toned paper, pencil	13.3 × 23.4	12–21.IX 1848; 22-30.VIII 1849
	Nikolai Island.	Paper, pencil	14 × 22.9	12–21.IX 1848; 22-30.VIII 1849
	Tents. Sketch	Paper, pencil	14 × 22.9	12–21.IX 1848; 22-30.VIII 1849
	Nikolai Island.	Paper, pencil	14.1 × 22.9	12–21.IX 1848; 22-30.VIII 1849
	Hills in the Steppe.	Toned paper, pencil	13.9 × 29.3	12–21.IX 1848; 22-30.VIII 1849
	Topographer on the Shore of the Aral Sea. Sketch	Paper, pencil	14.9 × 23.2	12–21.IX 1848; 22-30.VIII 1849
	Schooner. Topographic Works on the Shore of Kos-Aral. Sketches	Toned paper, pencil	12 × 20.8	6.X 1848–6.V 1849
	Schooner Near Kos-Aral Fortification.	Toned paper, pencil	15.8 × 29.4	22.IX-5.X 1849
	Lighthouse on Kos-Aral	Toned paper, pencil	15.8 × 23.3	6.X 1848–6.V 1849
	Kos-Aral Fortification and Head Sketches.	Paper, pencil	15.9 × 30.7	20.XI 1848–2.IV 1849
	Kazakh Boy Stoking the Stove. Sketch	Paper, pencil	18 × 27.3	6.X 1848–2.IV 1849
	On Deck of a Schooner.	Toned paper, pencil	14.6 × 22.3	6.V-22.IX 1849
	Chekan-Aral Island.	Toned paper, pencil	15.7 × 23.3	17–19.V 1849
	Busai Peninsula.	Toned paper, pencil	15.7 × 23.3	20–21.V 1849
	Tokpak-Atisse-Aulje.	Toned paper, pencil	16 × 29.3	24.VII 1849
	Tokpak-Atisse-Aulje.	Toned paper, pencil	15.8 × 23.6	24.VII 1849
	Karzundy.	Toned paper, pencil	16 × 29.3	28.VII 1849
	Kara-Tamak.	Toned paper, pencil	15.9 × 29.3	1.VIII 1849
	Kyzyl-Bulak.	Toned paper, pencil	15.8 × 29.6	1–2.VIII 1849
	Kaska-Dzhul.	Toned paper, pencil	15.8 × 29.1	2.VIII 1849
	Ak-Tumsuk.	Toned paper, pencil	15.7 × 29.4	3.VIII 1849
	Cape Ulkun-Tumsuk.	Toned paper, pencil	16 × 29.8	13–19.VIII 1849
	Bish-Kum.	Toned paper, pencil	16 × 29.6	1–3.IX 1849
	Us-Cheka.	Toned paper, pencil	16 × 29.4	18.IX 1849

=== Doubtful ===
Image	Name	Technique	Dimensions	Date
	Self-portrait with White Cap.	Paper, oil	26.1 × 20.1	XI 1849 — IV 1850
	Self-portrait with White Cap.	Paper, oil	24.5 × 19.8	XI 1849 — IV 1850
	Self-portrait with Black Cap.	Paper, oil	26.2 × 21.4	XI 1849 — IV 1850

=== Missing works ===
Name	Technique	Date
Caricature of Minister of Education S. S. Uvarov	—	VI — 20.XII 1847
Sand Dunes and Horses in the Foreground	—	11.V — 17.VI 1848
Portrait of Oleksii Ivanovych Maksheiev	Paper, watercolor	19.VI — 25.XII 1848
Caricature of Raim Officers	—	19.VI — 25.VII 1848; 1.III 1849
Portrait of Ensign Erast Vasylovych Nudatov	Paper, ink	19.VI — 25.VII 1848; 1.III 1849
Portrait of Ensign Erast Vasylovych Nudatov	—	19.VI — 25.VII 1848
Obruchev Island	—	7.IX 1848
Nikolai Island	—	12 — 21.IX 1848; 20 — 30.VIII 1849
Nikolai Island	—	12 — 21.IX 1848; 20 — 30.VIII 1849
Self-portrait	—	6.X 1848 — 6.V 1849
Kazakh Baksha	—	23.XI 1848 — 29.XII 1849
Menshikov Island	—	22 — 23.V, 18 — 20.VI 1849
Portrait of Matilda Petrivna Obrucheva	Oil	XI 1849 — IV 1850
Portrait of Karl Ivanovych Hern and His Wife	Oil	X 1849 — IV 1850
Crucifixion	Oil	7.III — IV 1850
Portrait of Fedir Matviiovych Lazarevskyi	—	12 — 27.IV 1850
As You See	—	VI 1847 — IV 1850
Drawings in Letters to A. I. Lysyhuh	—	20.XI 1847 — IV 1850

== Paintings and graphics, 1851–1857 ==
=== Works 1851–1857 ===
Image	Name	Technique	Dimensions	Year of creation
	Hanga-Baba.	Colored paper, watercolor	17.8 × 28.7	22.V 1851 — VII 1857
	Valley on the Khiva Road.	Paper, watercolor	12.3 × 30.5	23.V — 10.VII 1851
	View of the Karatau Mountains from the Apasyr Valley.	Paper, watercolor	15.6 × 28.4	1 — 20.VI 1851
	Aulja-Tau.	Paper, watercolor	16.3 × 29.1	1.VI — VIII 1851
	Trio.	Paper, sepia	18.3 × 25.4	VI — VIII 1851
	Moonlit Night in the Mountains.	Paper, watercolor	13.8 × 31.8	1.VI 1851 — VII 1857
	Turkmen Abis in the Karatau Mountains.	Paper, watercolor	16 × 29.1	20.VI 1851 – 13.V 1857
	Chyrkala-Tau.	Paper, watercolor	25.8 × 16.7	VII – VIII 1851
	Chyrkala-Tau	Paper, watercolor	12.9 × 32.2	VII 1851 – 13.V 1857
	Dalisman-Mula-Aulye.	Paper, watercolor		
	Akmysh-Tau.	Paper, watercolor	17.8 × 30.5	VII – 8.VIII 1851
	Akmysh-Tau.	Paper, watercolor	16.8 × 29.3	VII – 8.VIII 1851
	Mount Kulaat.	Paper, watercolor	12.8 × 31.9	VII 1851 – VII 1857
	Mount Kulaat.	Paper, sepia	24.3 × 17.9	VII – VIII 1851
	T. H. Shevchenko among comrades.	Colored paper, sepia, Chinese white	26 × 19.3	VII – VIII 1851
	Self-portrait	Toned bristol paper, Italian pencil, white highlights	22.1 × 17.7	VII – VIII 1851
	Turkmen Cemetery in the Valley of Dolnapa.	Paper, watercolor	16.5 × 22.5	VIII 1851
	Song of a Young Kazakh.	Paper, sepia	25.2 × 17.5	VI 1851 – VII 1857
	Portrait of Second Lieutenant Volodymyr Petrovych Vorontsov.	—	—	1851–1852
	Mangyshlak Garden.	Toned paper, sepia, ink, white highlights	16.2 × 30.1	1851–1852
	Mangyshlak Garden.	Colored paper, ink, white highlights, watercolor	35.7 × 41.5	1851–1852
	Mangyshlak Garden.	Colored paper, sepia, ink, pen, white heightening	14.6 × 23.6	1851–1852
	Mangyshlak Garden.	Colored paper, sepia, white heightening	14.7 × 23.5	1851–1852
	Mangyshlak Garden	Colored paper, ink, pen, sepia	14.5 × 23.6	1851–1852
	Mangyshlak Garden	Toned paper, ink, pen, sepia, white heightening	16.6 × 29.3	1851–1852
	Mangyshlak Garden	Colored paper, sepia, white heightening	14.4 × 23.6	1851–1852
	Mangyshlak Garden	Toned paper, pencil, sepia, ink, pen	16.4 × 29.4	1851–1852
	Mangyshlak Garden	Colored paper, sepia, ink, white heightening	14.6 × 23.2	1851–1852
	Mangyshlak Garden	Colored paper, sepia, ink, white paint	18.7 × 29.1	1851–1852
	Mangyshlak Garden	Paper, sepia	?	1851–1852
	Bay near the Fort of Novopetrovsk.	Paper, watercolor	?	1851–1853
	Portrait of M. F. Savychev	Colored paper, Italian pencil, white paint	22.5 × 21	June 1852
	Rock Monk.	Paper, watercolor	?	May–October 1853
	Mother's Prayer.	Paper, sepia	?	Summer 1853
	Beggar Children.	Paper, sepia	28.8 × 22	Autumn 1853
	Garden Near the Novopetrovsk Fortress.	Toned Paper, watercolor	12.4 × 29.8	Autumn 1853
	Portrait of A. O. Uskova. Oval	Paper, sepia	11.3 × 9.7	Summer 1853–1854
	Portrait of A. O. Uskov.	Paper, sepia	26.9 × 19.2	Summer 1853–1854
	Portrait of I. O. Uskov.	Toned Paper, Italian pencil, White Gouache	32.4 × 21.3	Summer 1853–July 1857
	Self-Portrait.	Paper, sepia	?	1851–1853
	Novopetrovsk Fortress from the Sea.	Paper, watercolor	12.3 × 30.5	1853–July 1857
	Garden Near the Novopetrovsk Fortress.	Toned Paper, watercolor	17.1 × 29	Summer 1854
	Mangyshlak Garden.	Colored Paper, watercolor	18.7 × 27.3	Summer 1854
	Portrait of A. O. Uskova with Daughter Natasha.	Paper, sepia	27.6 × 21.2	1854
	Portrait of Kateryna Ahafangeliivna and Mykola Yefremovych Bazhanov.	Paper, sepia	22.2 × 27.2	1854
	Portrait of Kateryna Ahafangeliivna Bazhanova.	Toned Paper, Italian pencil	27.5 × 17.8	1854
	Portrait of an Officer.	Paper, sepia	20.6 × 16.3	1854
	Beggars at the Window ("The State Fist")	Paper, sepia	?	June 10, 1855 – April 21, 1856
	Telemachus on the Island of Calypso.	Paper, sepia	25.3 × 20.5	Summer 1856
	Robinson Crusoe.	Paper, sepia, Bistre	24.2 × 19.3	Summer 1856
	Blessing of the Children.	Bristol Paper, sepia	28.8 × 21.7	Summer 1856
	The Samaritan Woman	Paper, sepia	28.9 × 21.6	Summer 1856
	Kazakh Woman.	Paper, sepia	28.2 × 21.7	Summer 1856
	Milo of Croton.	Paper, sepia	27 × 20.7	Summer 1856
	Narcissus and the Nymph Echo.	Bristol Paper, sepia	25.7 × 21.2	Summer 1856
	St. Sebastian.	Bristol Paper, sepia, White Gouache	25.4 × 21.5	Summer 1856
	Dying Gladiator.	Bristol Paper, sepia	24.9 × 19.4	Summer 1856
	Diogenes.	Paper, sepia, Bistre	23.1 × 20.3	Summer 1856
	After a Comrade's Drawing.	Paper, sepia	18.1 × 27.1	1857
	T. H. Shevchenko and a Kazakh Boy Playing with a Cat	Bristol Paper, sepia	(25.3 × 19.7)	Summer 1856 – April 1857
	The Happy Fisherman.	Paper, sepia	21.6 × 21.6	1856 – May 13, 1857
	Novopetrovsk Fortress from the Sea.	Paper, watercolor	12.3 × 30.6	1856 – May 13, 1857
	Novopetrovsk Fortress from the Khiva Road.	Paper, watercolor	12.2 × 32.1	1856 – May 13, 1857
	Cape Tyuk-Karagai on the Mangyshlak Peninsula.	Paper, watercolor, White Gouache	12.1 × 31.5	1856 – May 13, 1857
	The Kazakh Woman Katya.	Paper, sepia	27.6 × 21.5	1856 – July 1857
	Lost at Cards.	Paper, ink, Bistre	27.8 × 21.6	November 1856 – May 10, 1857
	At the Tavern.	Paper, ink, Bistre	27.8 × 21.8	November 1856 – May 10, 1857
	In the Barn.	Paper, ink, Bistre	28.2 × 21.6	November 1856 – May 10, 1857
	At the Cemetery.	Paper, ink, Bistre	28.2 × 21.6	November 1856 – May 10, 1857
	Among Robbers.	Paper, ink, Bistre	28.3 × 21.7	November 1856 – May 10, 1857
	Punishment with the Block.	Paper, ink, Bistre	28.2 × 21.7	November 1856 – May 10, 1857
	Punishment with Spitzruten.	Paper, ink, Bistre	28.8 × 21.5	November 1856 – May 10, 1857
	In Prison.	Paper, ink, Bistre	?	November 1856 – October 10, 1857
	The Barracks.	Paper, sepia	?	1856 – July 1857

=== Etudes, sketches and studies from 1851–1857 ===
Image	Name	Technique	Dimensions	Date
	Hanga-Baba.	Toned paper, pencil	16 × 29.4	22–23.V 1851
	Kuduk-Kshtym.	Toned paper, pencil	16 × 29.3	23–31.V 1851
	Valley of Apasyr.	Toned paper, pencil	16.6 × 29.4	1–20.VI 1851
	Foothills of Kara-Tau.	Toned paper, pencil	15.9 × 29.3	VI 1851
	Foothills of Kara-Tau.	Toned paper, pencil	16.4 × 29.1	VI 1851
	Cemetery of Agaspejar	Paper, pencil	17.2 × 30.5	20.VI–10.VII 1851
	View of the Ak-Tau Mountains from the Agaspejar Valley.	Toned paper, pencil	17.6 × 31.0	20.VI–10.VII 1851
	Mountains in the Agaspejar Valley.	Toned paper, pencil	17.9 × 31.3	20.VI – 10.VII 1851
	Mountain in the Agaspejar Valley.	Colored paper, pencil	18 × 30.7	20.VI – 10.VII 1851
	Sün-Kukh.	Paper, pencil	18 × 31.6	20.VI – 10.VII 1851
	Sün-Kukh.	Colored paper, pencil	16.4 × 29.3	20.VI – 10.VII 1851
	Sün-Kukh.	Colored paper, pencil	17.8 × 30.4	20.VI – 10.VII 1851
	Kairak-Tau.	Tinted paper, pencil	16.5 × 29.5	VII – 8.VIII 1851
	Caravan near the Mountains of Chirkala-Tau and Kok-Suyru.	Tinted paper, pencil	15.8 × 28.6	VII – 8.VIII 1851
	Chirkala-Tau.	Tinted paper, pencil	17.6 × 26.7	VII – 8.VIII 1851
	Chirkala-Tau.	Tinted paper, pencil	17.3 × 26.7	VII – 8.VIII 1851
	Expedition Camp.	Tinted paper, pencil	17.6 × 27.4	VII – 8.VIII 1851
	Dalismen-Mula-Aulje. Sketch	Colored paper, pencil	18.6 × 24.4	VI – 8.VIII 1851
	Mountain Range Ak-Tau.	Colored paper, pencil	17.7 × 28.9	VII – 8.VIII 1851
	Usyr-Tau.	Colored paper, pencil	19.1 × 29.2	VII – 8.VIII 1851
	Kugus Valley.	Tinted paper, pencil	17.1 × 31.1	VII – 8.VIII 1851
	Kok-Suyru.	Tinted paper, pencil	17.7 × 30.7	VII – 8.VIII 1851
	Chirkala-Tau and Kok-Suyru.	Tinted paper, pencil, white gouache	16.3 × 29.8	VII – 8.VIII 1851
	Tursch Valley.	Tinted paper, pencil	17.9 × 32.1	VII – 8.VIII 1851
	Mount Kulaat.	Tinted paper, pencil	18 × 32	VII – 8.VIII 1851
	Tarla.	Tinted paper, pencil	15.5 × 32.1	VIII 1851
	Valley in Mountainous Area.	Toned paper, pencil, white gouache	17.1 × 32	VIII 1851
	Tarla.	Toned paper, pencil, white gouache	16.9 × 31.7	VIII 1851
	Valley Between Mountains	Toned paper, pencil, white gouache	16.5 × 31.7	VIII 1851
	Kochak.	Toned paper, pencil	16.6 × 31.4	VIII 1851
	Expedition Camp.	Toned paper, pencil	16.5 × 29.7	VIII 1851
	Expedition Tents.	Toned paper, pencil	17.4 × 24.8	VIII 1851
	Kochak.	Toned paper, pencil	15.7 × 31.6	VIII 1851
	Tarla.	Toned paper, pencil, white gouache	15.2 × 31.4	VIII 1851
	Turkmen Yurts.	Toned paper, pencil	17.8 × 29.2	VIII – 6.IX 1851
	Khang-Baba.	Colored paper, pencil, white gouache	16.6 × 31.5	VIII – 6.IX 1851
	Mountain Landscape.	Paper, pencil	16.3 × 28.6	21.V – 6.IX 1851
	Cow's Head. Calf. Camel's Head. Sketches	Paper, pencil	13.2 × 24.4	21.V – 6.IX 1851
	A Kazakh Watering a Camel and Other Sketches.	Paper, pencil	13.2 × 24.4	21.V – 6.IX 1851
	Rocks.	Toned paper, pencil	14.3 × 23.4	21.V – 6.IX 1851
	Male Figure. Sketch	Paper, pencil	14.3 × 23.4	21.V – 6.IX 1851
	Rocks.	Colored paper, pencil, white gouache	14.7 × 22.5	21.V – 6.IX 1851
	Stones.	Colored paper, pencil	14.7 × 22.5	21.V – c. 6.IX 1851
	Bush Among Rocks.	Colored paper, pencil	13.8 × 19.2	21.V – 6.IX 1851
	Rocky Hill.	Toned paper, pencil	15.2 × 23.8	21.V – 6.IX 1851
	Rocks	Colored paper, pencil, white gouache	15.4 × 22.4	21.V – 6.IX 1851
	Rocks	Colored paper, pencil	15.3 × 22	21.V – 6.IX 1851
	Rocks	Colored paper, pencil	11.2 × 17.1	21.V – 6.IX 1851
	Rocks.	Colored paper, pencil	11.2 × 17.1	21.V – 6.IX 1851
	Rocks.	Colored paper, pencil	10.9 × 17.1	21.V – 6.IX 1851
	Rocks.	Colored paper, pencil	11.1 × 17.1	21.V – 6.IX 1851
	Rocks.	Toned paper, pencil	15.2 × 23.6	21.V – 6.IX 1851
	Apostle Peter. Sketch	Colored paper, sepia	15.1 × 10.3	VI – VIII 1851
	Apostle Peter. Sketch	Colored paper, pencil	15.1 × 10.3	VI – VIII 1851
	Vault of a Ruined Building.	Paper, pencil	10.5 × 17.2	22.V 1851–1855
	Tombstone in Khang-Baba.	Paper, pencil	17.3 × 10.7	22.V 1851–1855
	Tombstone.	Paper, pencil	17 × 10.6	22.V 1851–1855
	Tombstones in Khang-Baba. Sketches	Toned paper, pencil	11.6 × 28.8	22.V 1851–1855
	Turkmen Yurts.	Toned paper, pencil	12.2 × 27.1	27.V 1851–1855
	Mangyshlak Garden. Sketch	Paper, pencil, ink, pen, sepia	21.2 × 28.2	1851–1852
	Mangyshlak Garden. Sketch	Paper, pencil, ink	16.0 × 22.4	1851–1852
	Kazakh. Child. Sketches	Paper, pencil	16.6 × 29.3	1851–1852
	Bay near Novopetrovsk Fortress.	Toned paper, pencil	16.5 × 29.4	1851-VII 1853
	Tombstones at the Turkmen Cemetery.	Colored paper, pencil	13.8 × 18.8	1851 — VII 1857
	In the Vicinity of Novopetrovsk Fortress. Sketch	Toned paper, pencil	12.5 × 28.6	1851 — VII 1857
	In the Vicinity of Novopetrovsk Fortress.	Toned paper, pencil	11.9 × 28.6	1851 — VII 1857
	Dwelling in the Vicinity of Novopetrovsk Fortress.	Toned paper, pencil	14.2 × 19.3	1851 — VII 1857
	Novopetrovsk Fortress. Battery No.2.	Paper, pencil	13.2 × 24	1851 — VII 1857
	Service Building near Battery No. 2	Toned paper, pencil	12 × 14.3	1851 — VII 1857
	Camel. Camel's Head. Sketches	Paper, pencil	12 × 14.3	1851 — VII 1857
	Novopetrovsk Fortress and View of Nikolaevskaya Stanitsa.	Toned paper, pencil	12.5 × 31.4	1851 — VII 1857
	Flagpole of Novopetrovsk Fortress and View of Nikolaevskaya Stanitsa.	Toned paper, pencil	12.6 × 28.5	1851 — VII 1857
	Flagpole of Novopetrovsk Fortress.	Toned paper, pencil	16 × 29.3	1851 — VII 1857
	Flagpole of Novopetrovsk Fortress	Toned paper, pencil	15.4 × 31.8	1851 — VII 1857
	Nikolaevskaya Stanitsa.	Toned paper, pencil	16.1 × 29.4	1851 — VII 1857
	Military Post near Novopetrovsk Fortress.	Paper, pencil	12.2 × 30.6	1851 — VII 1857
	Near Novopetrovsk Fortress.	Toned paper, pencil	12.6 × 31.6	1851 — VII
	Rock near Novopetrovsk Fort.	Toned paper, pencil	13.9 × 34.3	1851–VII 1857
	Rocky Coast near the Novopetrovsk Fort.	Paper, pencil	14.5 × 32.4	1851–VII 1857
	Fort Novopetrovsk from the Harbor Side.	Paper, pencil	16 × 29.4	1851–VII 1857
	Schooner in the Harbor of the Novopetrovsk Fort.	Tinted paper, pencil	13 × 7.2	1851–VII 1857
	Resurrection. Sketch.	Paper, sepia, pencil, ink	18.6 × 10.8	1852
	Place for the Future Garden near the Novopetrovsk Fort.	Tinted paper, pencil	12.1 × 32.5	Summer 1853
	Female Figure, Sunflower, Pumpkin Vines, etc. Studies and Sketches.	Tinted paper, pencil	12.9 × 34.3	Summer 1854
	Garden Plants. Studies.	Tinted paper, pencil	33.2 × 13.6	Summer 1854
	Plant. Sketch.	Paper, pencil	33.2 × 13.6	Summer 1854
	Ornamental Plants. Studies.	Tinted paper, pencil	30.3 × 12	Summer 1854
	Portrait of A. O. Uskova with Daughter Natascha. Sketch Design	Paper, pencil	30.3 × 12	1854
	Garden near the Novopetrovsk Fort.	Tinted paper, pencil	17.1 × 29	1854–1855
	Near the Novopetrovsk Fort. Sketch	Tinted paper, pencil	11.4 × 28.7	1854–VII 1857
	Gravestone at the Cemetery of Novopetrovsk Fort	Tinted paper, pencil	13.7 × 33.1	1854 – VII 1857
	Cemetery of Novopetrovsk Fort.	Tinted paper, pencil	11.6 × 28.6	1854 – VII 1857
	Baigush. Soldiers in the Hospital. Study and sketch	Paper, pencil	23.6 × 28.6	1855–1856
	Landscape in the Vicinity of Novopetrovsk Fort. Sketch	Tinted paper, pencil	11.4 × 28.6	1855–1856
	Service Building Near Battery No. 2. Sketch	Tinted paper, pencil	12.9 × 28.7	1855 – VII 1857
	Plants. Studies	Tinted paper, pencil	14.3 × 24.3	Summer 1856
	Beetle, Water Flowers, Plant. Studies	Tinted paper, pencil	10.6 × 28.6	Summer 1856
	Milo of Croton. Selene and Endymion. Sketches and drafts	Paper, pencil	10.6 × 28.6	1856
	Bat, Dog. Sketches	Tinted paper, pencil	11.2 × 14	1856
	St. Sebastian. Sketch	Paper, pencil	14 × 11.2	1856
	Thistle. Study	Tinted paper, pencil	14.3 × 24.3	1856
	Reed. Study	Tinted paper, pencil	17.2 × 13.1	1856
	Kazakh Nomadic Camp.	Tinted paper, pencil	11.3 × 28.3	1856
	The Samaritan Woman. In the Barn. Sketch drafts	Paper, pencil	?	1856
	Novopetrovsk Fort from the Khiva Road.	Tinted paper, pencil, white gouache	12.3 × 33.5	1856 – 13.V 1857
	Novopetrovsk Fort. Interior View.	Tinted paper, pencil	12 × 28	1856 – VII 1857

=== Doubtful ===
Image	Name	Technique	Dimensions	Year
	Kazakh Yurt in the Steppe.	Paper, watercolor	?	1851–1857

=== Missing works ===
Name	Technique	Year
Drawing at A. I. Lysohub.	Watercolor or Sepia.	XI 1850 — I 1851
Portrait of Lieutenant Oleksandr Havrylovych Frolov.	—	1851–1852
Drawings in Karatau.	—	VI — VIII 1851
Drawing.	—	8.VI — VIII 1851
Drawings.	—	8.VI — VIII 1851
Drawings.	—	8.VI — VIII 1851
Drawing.	—	8.VI — VIII 1851
Drawings.	—	8.VI — VIII 1856
Drawing.	—	[8.VI — VIII 1851].
Gypsy.	Paper, sepia.	VI — VIII 1851
Apostle Peter.	Paper, sepia.	VI — VIII 1851
Landscapes of Karatau and the Novopetrovsk Fortress.	Paper, watercolor.	VI 1851 — 13.V 1857
Kochak.	Paper, watercolor.	1851 — 13.V 1857
Sandstorm in the Mangyshlak Desert.	Paper, watercolor.	1851–1856
Portraits of Soldiers and Officers.	—	1851 — VII 1857
Merchant Frying Scrambled Eggs.	—	1851 — VII 1857
Portrait of E. M. Kosarev.	Paper, pencil.	1852 — VII 1857
View of Astrabad (Mirage).	—	1852 — II 1857
Sculptures.	—	1853
Relief. Plaster.	—	15.VI 1853
Monument at the Grave of Uskov's Son.	—	VI 1853
Trio. Relief.	—	15.VI — 6.X 1853
Bull and Kirghiz. Relief.	—	1853
Christ with a Crown of Thorns. Relief.	—	1853–1854
Caspian Sea with Two Whirlwinds.	—	1853–1854
Sculpture Group.	—	1853–1856
Night.	Paper, watercolor.	Summer 1854
Self-Portrait.	—	3.XI 1854
John the Baptist. Relief.	—	1855
Two Drawings.	—	25.IX 1855 — 22.IV 1856
Skilled Seller.	Paper, sepia.	1856 — 13.V 1857
Daughter of a Chiot Potter.	Paper, sepia.	II — V 1857
Scene in the Barracks.	Paper, sepia.	II — V 1857
Prayer for the Deceased.	Paper.	13 — 20.V 1857
Prayer for the Deceased.	Paper.	13 — 20.V 1857
Portrait of M. Y. Bashanov.	Paper, pencil.	15.VI 1857
Novopetrovsk Fortress. Battery No. 1.	Pencil	29.VII 1857
Portrait of Natasha Uskova.	Paper, sepia	VII 1857
Night in a Tatar Cemetery.	Paper, watercolor.	11.VI — VII 1857

== Paintings and graphics 1857–1861 ==
=== Works 1857–1861 ===
Image	Name	Technique	Dimensions	Year
	In Astrakhan.	Toned paper, pencil	10.1 × 28.6	5 – 22.VIII 1857
	Kamyshin.	Toned paper, pencil	12.7 × 28.6	29.VIII 1857
	Portrait of K. N. Kosachenko.	Toned paper, Italian and white pencil	28.6 × 25.1	30.VIII 1857
	Near Saratov.	Toned paper, pencil	12.3 × 28.5	31.VIII – 1.IX 1857
	Saratov.	Toned paper, pencil	10.7 × 28.6	31.VIII – 1.IX 1857
	Portrait of T. Z. Epifanov.	Toned paper, Italian and white pencil	28.7 × 21.1	2.IX 1857
	Tsar's Mound.	Toned paper, pencil	12.4 × 28.3	7.IX 1857
	Tsar's Mound.	Toned paper, pencil	11.7 × 27.3	7.IX 1857
	Kazan.	Toned paper, pencil	11.7 × 28.6	14.IX 1857
	Opposite Kazan.	Toned paper, pencil	12.5 × 28.7	14.IX 1857
	Portrait of M. P. Komarovsky.	Toned paper, Italian and white pencil	31.8 × 25.5	15.IX 1857
	Portrait of E. O. Panchenko.	Toned paper, Italian and white pencil	28.6 × 25.2	16.IX 1857
	Annunciation Cathedral in Nizhny Novgorod.	Toned paper, sepia, whitewash	17 × 31	26.IX 1857
	Portrait of Pavlo Abramovych Ovsiannikov.	Toned paper, Italian pencil	31.8 × 25.2	30.IX 1857
	Archangel Cathedral in Nizhny Novgorod.	Toned paper, sepia, whitewash	16.6 × 31.2	11 – 12.X 1857
	Portrait of the Jacobi Couple.	Toned paper, Italian and white pencil	35.7 × 27	8 – 9.XI 1857
	Self-Portrait.	Toned paper, Italian and white pencil	31.4 × 24.6	28.XI 1857
	Self-Portrait.	Toned paper, Italian and white pencil	25.5 × 21.2	4.I 1858
	Portrait of K. A. Shreyder.	Toned paper, Italian and white pencil	34.6 × 28.3	10.I 1858
	Portrait of a Policeman.	Paper, pencil	25 × 22	20.IX 1857
	Portrait of A. K. Kadnitsky.	Toned paper, Italian and white pencil	34.3 × 27	12.II 1858
	Portrait of M. A. Frelih.	Toned paper, Italian and white pencil	30 × 23.5	12.II – 7.III 1858
	Portrait of a Child.	Toned paper, Italian and white pencil	35.6 × 28.5	1858
	Portrait of M. S. Shchepkin.	Toned paper, Italian and white pencil	35.8 × 28.7	16.III 1858
	Portrait of M. M. Lazarevsky.	Toned paper, Italian pencil, chalk	29.5 × 23	28.III 1858
	Portrait of M. S. Kshyshevych.	Toned paper, Italian and white pencil	33.7 × 26.2	6.V 1858
	Portrait of B. Sukhanov-Podkolsin.	Paper, pencil	21.3 × 15.7	21.V 1858
	Two Girls.	Paper, etching, aquatint	14.6 × 10.7; 20.8 × 13; 31.6 × 21.6	V 1858
	Holy Family.	Paper, etching, aquatint	22 × 16.5; 26.9 × 18.8; 42.5 × 32	V – 12.VII 1858
	Alone in Her House.	Paper, sepia	26.5 × 35.8	21.V 1858
	The Parable of the Workers in the Vineyard.	Paper, sepia	22 × 29.5	15.VII 1858
	The Parable of the Workers in the Vineyard.	Paper, etching, aquatint	29 × 40; 36 × 44.5; 41 × 53	15.VII – 7.XI 1858
	Portrait of Ira Aldridge.	Colored paper, Italian and white pencil	35.6 × 28.3	25.XII 1858
	Portrait of M. O. Severtsov.	Colored paper, Italian and white pencil	29.8 × 28	27.III 1859
	Portrait of V. L. Kochubey.	Canvas (oval), oil	92 × 76.7	III – 25.V 1859
	Borys Sukhanov-Podkolsin.	Toned paper, Italian pencil, chalk	25.4 × 34.5	III 1859
	Mermaids.	Paper, sepia, white highlights	30.3 × 45.4	I 1859
	Friends.	Paper, etching, aquatint	14.2 × 20.2; 18 × 23; 31.2 × 35	15.III 1859
	Old Man in the Cemetery.	Paper, sepia	28.7 × 21.6	15.III 1859
	Old Man in the Cemetery.	Paper, etching, aquatint	28.4 × 20.8; 32.2 × 29.9; 43.6 × 30.9	15.III 1859
	Evening in Albano Near Rome (Forest)	Paper, ink, pen, sepia	22.5 × 28.2	25.V 1859
	Evening in Albano Near Rome (Forest).	Paper, etching, aquatint	22.5 × 28.2; 27.3 × 30.7; 29.3 × 37.2	25.V 1859
	Portrait of M. O. Maksymovych.	Toned paper, Italian pencil, chalk	34 × 26.9	19.VI 1859
	Portrait of M. V. Maksymovych.	Toned paper, Italian pencil, chalk	34 × 26.5	22.VI 1859
	Portrait of A. O. Lazarevska.	Toned paper, Italian pencil, chalk	29.5 × 23.1	22.VIII 1859
	The Garden of Mangyshlak.	Paper, etching, aquatint	15.6 × 22.2; 18.4 × 23; 21.3 × 25.5	24.IX 1859
	Alone in Her House.	Paper, etching, aquatint	18.5 × 25.5; 21.8 × 28; 31 × 43.7	11.XI 1859
	Self-Portrait.	Canvas, oil	44.4 × 35.5	1859
	House Project. Facade.	Paper, watercolor	25.9 × 34.1	II — 25.VIII 1860
	House Project. Side Facade.	Paper, watercolor	22 × 29.7	II — 25.VIII 1860
	Self-Portrait in a Dark Suit.	Paper, etching	16.4 × 12.3; 21.1 × 13.1	14.III 1860
	Self-Portrait in a Dark Suit.	Paper, etching, aquatint	13.6 × 10.2; 16.1 × 12.5; 31 × 21.5	14.III 1860
	Self-Portrait with Beard.	Paper, etching	16.9 × 12.5; 22 × 16; 42.6 × 31	4.Apr 1860
	Bathsheba.	Paper, etching, aquatint	36.2 × 27.1	30. May 1860
	Portrait of Lykera Polusmakova.	Tinted paper, Italian pencil	34 × 23.3	Summer 1860
	Oak.	Paper, etching, aquatint	21.9 × 28.3; 27.7 × 31.3; 33.7 × 50.5	Aug 1860
	Still Life.	Paper, pencil, sepia	32.7 × 24.4	1860
	Boy as Model.	Paper, pencil, sepia	32.7 × 24.4	1860
	Model Woman.	Paper, etching	23 × 22.5; 31 × 27.4; 43.7 × 34.1	1860
	Self-Portrait with Candle.	Paper, etching, aquatint	16.4 × 13; 22.5 × 16.2; 43 × 31.1	Jun 1860
	Self-Portrait in a Light Suit.	Paper, etching	16.5 × 12.5; 21 × 13.6	1860
	Self-Portrait with Hat and Fur Coat.	Paper, etching	22.8 × 17.8; 23.3 × 18.4; 42.3 × 31.3	4.Dec 1860
	Portrait of F. A. Bruni.	Paper, etching	16.2 × 12.2; 16.6 × 12.6; 25.4 × 18.6	1860
	Portrait of F. P. Tolstoi.	Paper, etching	15.7 × 11.9; 16.2 × 12.4; 31.2 × 21.8	1860
	Portrait of P. K. Klodt.	Paper, etching	16.4 × 12.5; 16.7 × 12.9; 31.2 × 21.7	Jan–Feb 1861
	Portrait of I. I. Hornostajiw.	Paper, etching	16.5 × 12.5; 31.5 × 21.8	Jan–Feb 1861
	Self-Portrait.	Canvas, oil	59 × 49	Jan–Feb 1861

=== Albums 1858–1859 ===
Image	Name	Technique	Dimensions	Year of Creation
	The Priest.	Paper, ink, pen	16.1 × 22.9	May 10, 1858
	Two Girls.	Paper, ink, pen	22.9 × 16.1	May 1858
	The Reader.	Paper, ink, pen	16.1 × 22.9	May 10, 1858
	Burdocks.	Paper, pencil	16.1 × 22.9	1858–1859
	The Doctor.	Paper, ink, pen	16.2 × 23	May 10, 1858
	In Lychwyn.	Paper, ink, pen, sepia	16.2 × 23	June 6–9, 1859
	Burdocks and Other Sketches.	Paper, pencil, ink, pen	16.2 × 23	June–August 1859
	In Lychwyn.	Paper, ink, pen	16.2 × 22.7	June 6–9, 1859
	Oak. Study	Paper, pencil, ink, pen	16.2 × 22.7	June 6–9, 1859
	Near Kaniv.	Paper, pencil, ink, pen	16.2 × 23.7	June 12–27, 1859
	In Korsun.	Paper, ink, pen	16.2 × 22.9	June 28–July 12, 1859
	Trees. Study	Paper, ink, pen	23 × 16.2	June 28–July 12, 1859
	Tree.	Paper, ink, pen	22.8 × 16.2	June–August 1859
	Edge of the Forest.	Paper, pencil, ink, pen	16.2 × 23	June–August 1859
	Oak.	Paper, pencil, ink, pen	16.2 × 22.9	June–August 1859
	In Mezhyritsch.	Paper, ink, pen	16.2 × 22.6	July 5–12, 1859
	Water Lilies. Sketch	Paper, pencil	16.2 × 22.6	June–August 1859
	In Cherkasy.	Paper, pencil, ink, pen, brush	16.2 × 22.8	July 18–22, 1859

=== Studies and sketches from 1857–1860 ===
Image	Name	Technique	Dimensions	Year of Creation
	Volga.	Toned paper, pencil	11.5 × 26.4	29.VIII – 20.IX 1857
	Volga.	Toned paper, pencil	10.3 × 28.6	31.VIII – 3.IX 1857
	Balakovo.	Toned paper, pencil	11.3 × 28.6	3.IX 1857
	View of Nizhny Novgorod.	Paper, pencil	22.9 × 36.5	20.IX – XI 1857
	Bohdan Khmelnytsky before the Crimean Khan. Sketch draft	Paper, colored pencils	28.2 × 36	22.IX 1857
	Bohdan Khmelnytsky. Sketch	Paper, pencil	24.8 × 19	22.IX 1857
	Bohdan Khmelnytsky. Sketch	Paper, pencil	24.9 × 18.9	22.IX 1857
	Head of Christ. Sketch	Paper, pencil, ink, pen	10.8 × 10.8; 31 × 22	26–27.IX 1857
	Pechersk Monastery in Nizhny Novgorod.	Toned paper, pencil	16.6 × 31.6	9.X 1857
	Church of Elijah in Nizhny Novgorod.	Toned paper, pencil	16.4 × 32.6	27.X 1857
	Nikolaus Church in Nizhny Novgorod.	Toned paper, pencil	16.2 × 32.3	28.X 1857
	Annunciation Monastery in Nizhny Novgorod.	Toned paper, pencil	16.1 × 31.5	30.X 1857
	Portrait of A. I. Herzen. Sketch	Paper, pencil	9 × 8; 31 × 22	10.XII 1857
	Two Girls. Sketch	Paper, pencil, ink	14.5 × 20.7	18–21.XII 1857
	Two Girls.	Paper, etching, aquatint	15.1 × 10.1; 20.7 × 12.9; 25.6 × 7.8	V 1858
	Alone in Her House. Sketch	Paper, pencil	26.5 × 37	21.V 1858
	In the Harem. Study	Paper, pencil	26.5 × 37	21.V 1858
	In the Harem.	Paper, pencil	30.4 × 37	21.V 1858
	Self-Portrait of Rembrandt with Saber	Paper, etching	19.4 × 16.2; 22.1 × 17.3	15.VII 1858
	Lazar Klap.	Paper, etching	9.8 × 8.7; 13.8 × 9	15.VII 1858
	Peasant with Saber and Stick.	Paper, etching	7.8 × 4.4; 8.5 × 5.4	15.VII 1858
	Mermaid. Study	Tinted paper, charcoal, gouache	35.9 × 28.8	III 1859
	Mermaid. Study	Tinted paper, charcoal, gouache	36 × 28.3	III 1859
	Mermaid. Study	Tinted paper, charcoal, gouache	34.5 × 55.8	III 1859
	Old Man in the Cemetery.	Paper, pencil	28.1 × 21.4	15.III 1859
	Above the Ros.	Paper, pencil	21.8 × 30.4	VII 1859
	Above the Ros. Sketch	Paper, pencil	21.8 × 30.4	VII 1859
	House Plan. Architectural Project.	Paper, pencil, watercolor	20.4 × 28.4	II 1860
	House Plan. Architectural Project.	Paper, ink, watercolor	20.5 × 27.5	II 1860
	House Plan. Schematic Drawing.	Paper, pencil, ink	13.3 × 16.4	18.II 1860
	House Plan. Architectural Project	Paper, pencil, ink	25,3 × 34,2	18.II 1860
	House Plan. Schematic Drawing.	Paper, pencil	10.6 × 13.3	25.VIII 1860
	Granary. Schematic Plan.	Paper, pencil	10.6 × 13.3	VIII 1860
	Nude Model	Tinted paper, sepia, White Gouache, Colored Pencil	23.7 × 23.7	1860
	Nude Model	Paper, pencil	27 × 24.4	1860

=== Doubtful ===
Image	Name	Technique	Dimensions	Year
	Portrait of an Unknown Person	Canvas, oil	52.5 × 40.5	1857–1858

=== Missing works ===
Name	Technique	Year
Drawings 1838–1857 (sold at auction to friends of Shevchenko in May 1861)	—	1838–1857
Self-portrait	Paper, pencil	1840–1861
Hermaphrodite	—	IX 1841
Self-portrait	Paper, ink, pen	1843
Sketchbooks	—	1843–1847
Drawings of the Perepiat Tomb	—	June–September 1846
Self-portrait	Italian pencil, paper	1847–1857
Portrait of Vladimir Vasilievich Kishkin	—	23.IX 1857
St. George's Church in Nizhny Novgorod	—	25.IX 1857
Portrait of Anchen Schaubbe	—	28.IX 1857
Bell Tower of the Archangel Cathedral in Nizhny Novgorod	—	29.IX 1857
Self-portrait	Paper, sepia or Ink	IX 1857–III 1858
Portrait of I.P. Gras	—	2.X 1857
Portrait of Adelaide Alexeyevna Brilkina	—	4.X 1857
Portrait of Nikolai Alexandrovich Brilkin	Paper	10.X 1857
Portrait of Anna Nikolayevna Popova	Paper, pencil	13–14.X 1857
Kremlin Wall in Nizhny Novgorod and Landscape of the Trans-Volga	Paper, pencil	15.X 1857
Landscape of the Trans-Volga	Paper, sepia, watercolor	X 1857–III 1858
Portrait of Maria Alexandrovna Dorokhova	Paper	1–4.XI 1857
Portrait of Nina Pushchina	—	4.XI 1857
Portrait of Sofia Fyodorovna Warenzova with Son	—	14–19.XI 1857
Group Portrait of K.A. Schreider, A.K. Kadnitsky, and M.A. Frelih. Sketch	Paper, pencil	30.XI 1857
Portrait of Olejnikov	—	9.I 1858
Portrait of Alexander Yevgrafovich Babkin	Paper	13.I 1858
Portrait of Gavril Sukhanov-Podkolsin	Paper, pencil	28.III 1858
Portrait of the Daughter of S.S. Gulak-Artemovsky	Tinted paper, pencil	28.III 1858–1860
Willows at the Smolensk Cemetery	Tinted paper, pencil	IV 1858–1860
Two Girls	Paper, sepia	V 1858
Turkish Man with Odalisque	Paper, sepia	V 1858
Portrait of Nadya Kartashevskaya	—	VI 1858–Spring 1860
Portrait of Ira Aldridge	Paper, etching	25.XII 1858
Somko-Mushket	—	III–V 1859
Landscape in Moshny	Paper	VI 1859
Oak Tree	Paper, pencil	VIII 1860
Self-portrait	Oil	VIII 1860
Portrait of Lev Mikhailovich Shemchushnikov	Canvas, oil	1860
Portrait of L.I. Solotova	Canvas, oil	1860
Portrait of an Unknown Woman	—	I 1861
