= British Mandate =

British Mandate may refer to:

- British Mandate of Palestine (disambiguation)
  - Mandate for Palestine, a 1920 League of Nations mandate for territory formerly held by the Ottoman Empire in Palestine.
  - Mandatory Palestine, the geopolitical entity controlled by the United Kingdom from 1920 to 1948 under the League of Nations mandate
- Mandate for Mesopotamia, an unratified 1920 proposal to the League of Nations regarding the government of Iraq

== See also ==
- Mandatory Iraq (Mandatory Mesopotamia), British administration of Iraq from 1920 to 1932, following the 1920 Iraqi Revolt against the proposed British Mandate of Mesopotamia
