= Mandate for Mesopotamia =

Proposed League of Nations Mandate for Iraq

Draft Mandate for Mesopotamia
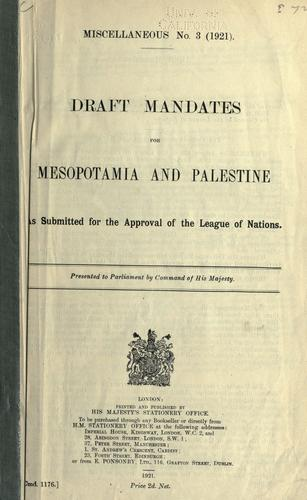
- Draft mandates for Mesopotamia and Palestine as submitted for the approval of the League of Nations on 7 December 1920
- Created: 1920 (draft only)
- Ratified: Not ratified
- Author: League of Nations
- Purpose: Proposed creation of the territory of Mesopotamia. The Kingdom of Iraq was created instead

The Mandate for Mesopotamia (Arabic: الانتداب على بلاد ما بين النهرين, romanized: al-Intidāb ʿalā Bilād mā bayn an-Nahrayn) was a proposed League of Nations mandate to cover Ottoman Iraq. The mandate would have been entrusted to the United Kingdom but was superseded by the Anglo-Iraqi Treaty of 1922, an agreement between the British and the Iraqis with some similarities to the proposed mandate. On paper, the mandate lasted from 1920 to 1932.

== History ==
The proposed mandate was awarded on 25 April 1920 in Italy at the San Remo Conference in accordance with the 1916 Sykes–Picot Agreement, but the mandate not yet documented or defined. It was to be a Class A mandate under Article 22 of the Covenant of the League of Nations. A draft mandate document was prepared by the British Colonial Office in June 1920 and submitted in draft form to the League of Nations in December 1920.

Immediately after the end of the First World War, Sir Arnold Wilson, the future High Commissioner to Iraq, recommended the annexation of Mesopotamia to British India "as a colony of India and the Indians, such as the government of India administer it and gradually cultivate its vast plains, and settle the warrior Punjab races in it". In a memorandum written on 22 April 1918, High Commissioner Sir Percy Cox listed the social groups that the British should support: the Jewish community in Baghdad, the notables in Baghdad and Basara, the rich land-owning Arabs and Jews and the Shaikhs of the sedentary tribes. Mosul was added to the region of British influence after the 1918 Clemenceau–Lloyd George Agreement.

The proposed mandate faced certain difficulties to be established. A nationwide Iraqi revolt broke out in 1920, which made the British decide that the territory would become the Kingdom of Iraq, as stated in the Anglo-Iraqi Treaty of October 1922. The Kingdom of Iraq became independent in 1931–1932 in accordance with the stance of the League of Nations, which stated that such territories would be facilitated into "progressive development" as fully independent states.

The civil government of British-administered Mandatory Iraq was headed originally by Cox and his deputy, Colonel Arnold Wilson. British reprisals after the murder of a British officer in Najaf failed to restore order. British administration had yet to be established in the mountains of northern Iraq. The most striking problem facing the British was the growing anger of the nationalists, who felt betrayed at being accorded mandatatory status.

== Maps ==
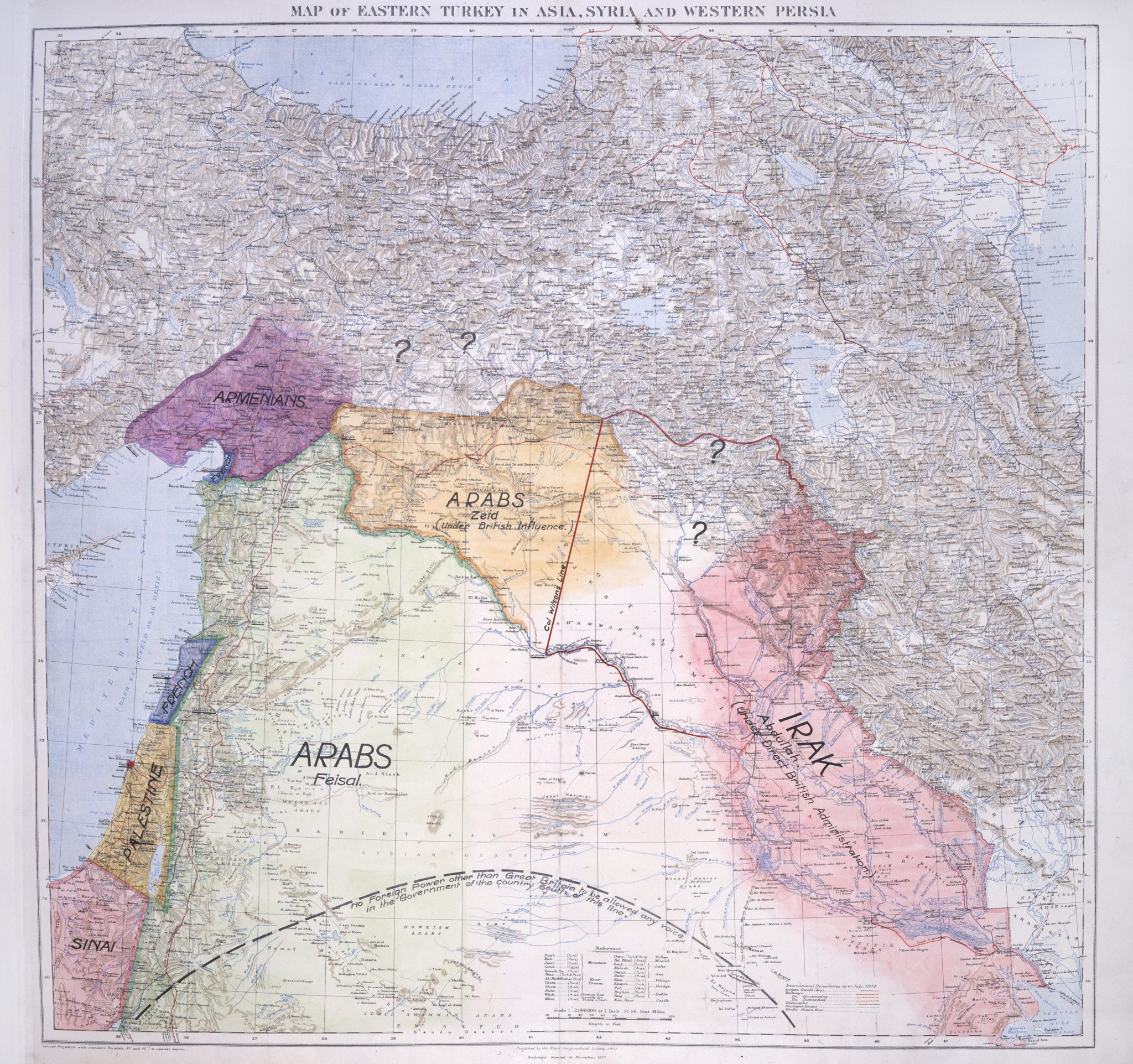
Map presented by T. E. Lawrence to the Eastern Committee of the War Cabinet in November 1918

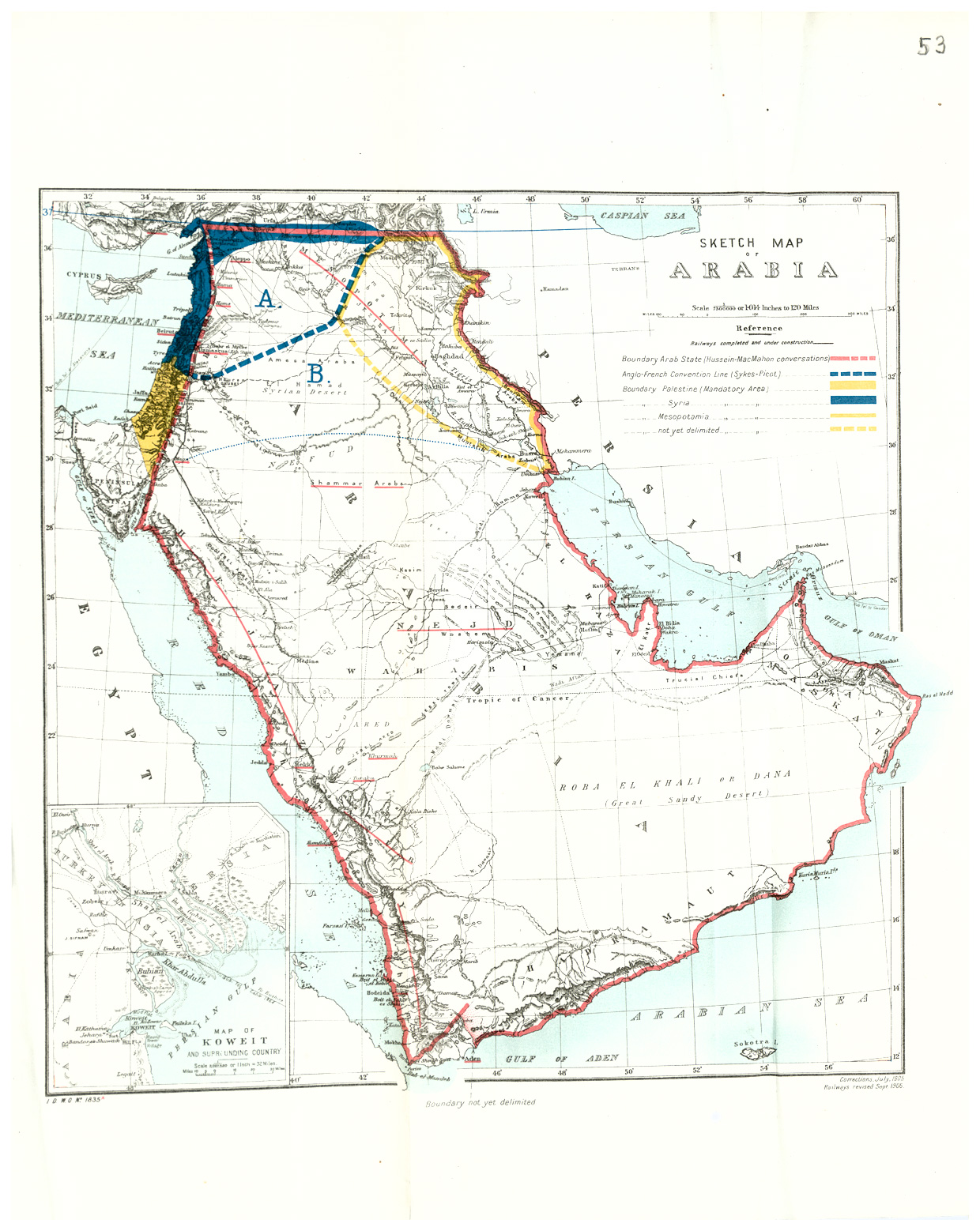
British government map appended to 1921 CAB24/120 cabinet memorandum showing proposed mandates
