= Basara =

Basara may refer to:

== Places ==
- Basara, Pirot, Serbia
- Basara, Telangana, a census town in Nirmal district in the state of Telangana, India (also known as Basar)
- Basra, a city in Iraq (also known as Basara)

== Entertainment ==
- Basara (manga), a 1990–98 manga series by Yumi Tamura
- Basara Nekki, a character in the anime series Macross 7
- Kubikiri Basara, a character in Samurai Shodown
- Sengoku Basara, Japanese name of the video game Devil Kings
  - Devil Kings Basara, a manga series based on the video game
- Basara (wrestler), Japanese professional wrestler
- Pro-Wrestling Basara, a Japanese professional wrestling promotion founded in 2015

== Surname ==
Basara (Serbian Cyrillic: Бaсapa) is a Serbian surname. It may refer to:

- Marko Basara (born 1984), Serbian footballer
- Svetislav Basara (born 1953), Serbian writer
- Svetomir Arsić-Basara (1928–2024), Serbian writer and sculptor

== See also ==
- Basra (disambiguation)
- Basar (disambiguation)
