= British Mandate of Palestine =

British Mandate of Palestine or Palestine Mandate most often refers to:

- Mandate for Palestine, a League of Nations mandate under which the British controlled an area which included Mandatory Palestine and the Emirate of Transjordan
- Mandatory Palestine, the territory and its history between 1920 and 1948

== See also ==
- British Mandate (disambiguation)
