= Basar =

Basar may refer to:

- Gnana Saraswati Temple, Basar, Hindu temple located on the banks of the Godavari River
- Basar, Telangana, India
- Basar, Arunachal Pradesh, India

== See also ==
- Basara (disambiguation)
- Basra (disambiguation)
- Bazaar (disambiguation)
- Başar, Turkish name
