= Barsa-Kelmes Nature Reserve =

Wildlife refuge on the former island of Barsa-Kelmes in Kazakhstan

- IUCN category Ia (strict nature reserve)
- Location within Kazakhstan
- Location: Kyzylorda Region, Kazakhstan
- Coordinates: 45°38′07″N 59°54′30″E
- Area: 160 826 ha
- Established: 1939

UNESCO World Heritage Site
- Official name: Cold Winter Deserts of Turan
- Type: Natural
- Criteria: ix, x
- Designated: 2023 (45th session)
- Reference no.: 1693

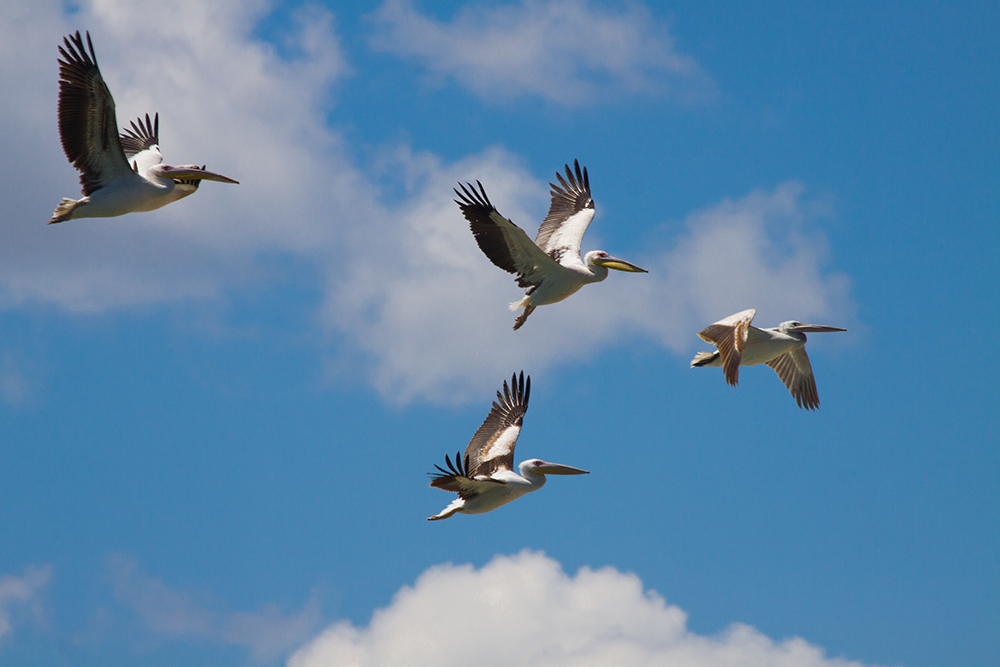
Pelicans in Barsa-Kelmes

Barsa-Kelmes Nature Reserve (Kazakh: Барсакелмес мемлекеттік табиғи қорығы, Barsakelmes memlekettık tabiği qoryğy) is a wildlife refuge on the former island of Barsa-Kelmes in Kyzylorda Region of Kazakhstan, in Central Asia. It has been greatly affected by the drastic drying up of the Aral Sea—in which it was formerly located—due to gross government mismanagement.

== History ==
When it was created in 1939, the reserve was on an island in the Aral Sea. However, the Soviet government diverted the rivers feeding the sea to irrigate cotton fields. By 2017, the sea, which once had a surface area of around 68,000 square kilometres (26,000 sq mi) had shrunk to roughly a tenth of that and split up into four smaller bodies of water. Barsa-Kelmes is no longer an island, instead sitting in the Aralkum Desert between two of these new bodies of water, the North Aral Sea and the South Aral Sea.

== Flora and fauna ==
It was founded in 1939 as a refuge for the saiga antelope (Saiga tatarica) and the goitered gazelle (Gazella subgutturosa). In 1953, the Turkmenian kulan (Equus hemionus kulan), also known as the Transcaspian wild ass, was brought to what was then an island covering 186 square kilometres (72 sq mi). As of 2021, the kulan number about 500 or 690, while there are 47 saigas and 17 gazelles.

The reserve is home to hundreds of plant and animal species.

Black saxaul shrubs (Haloxylon aphyllum) are being planted by the United States Agency for International Development to help re-establish local plants and animals.
