= Basra, Chakwal =

Basra
- Location within Pakistan
- Coordinates: 32.46°N 71.59°E
- Country: Pakistan
- Province: Punjab
- Elevation: 350 m (1,150 ft)
- Time zone: UTC+5 (PST)

Basra is a village of Chakwal District in the Punjab province of Pakistan. It is located at 32°46'43N 71°59'4E with an altitude of 350 metres (1151 feet). The village is inhabited by the Basra sub-clan of the Jat tribe.
