= Chełm (disambiguation) =

Chełm is a city in Lublin Voivodeship, eastern Poland.

Chełm may also refer to the following places in Poland:

- Chełm County, Lublin Voivodeship
- Chełm, part of the Zwierzyniec district of Kraków
- Chełm, Bochnia County in Lesser Poland Voivodeship (southern Poland)
- Chełm, Olkusz County in Lesser Poland Voivodeship (southern Poland)
- Chełm, Lubin County in Lower Silesian Voivodeship (south-west Poland)
- Chełm, Gmina Malczyce in Środa County, Lower Silesian Voivodeship (south-west Poland)
- Chełm Śląski (Silesian Chełm) in Silesian Voivodeship (southern Poland)
- Chełm, Warmian-Masurian Voivodeship (northern Poland)
- Chełm, Gdańsk, district of the city of Gdańsk

Chełm may also refer to:

- Chełm (parliamentary constituency), a parliamentary constituency in Poland
- Chełm, a legendary Jewish town of foolish persons

== See also ==
- KELM (disambiguation)
