= Basrah, Yemen =

Coordinates: 14°41′N 49°13′E

Basrah
- Interactive map of Basrah
- Country: Yemen
- Governorate: Hadhramaut
- Time zone: UTC+3 (Yemen Standard Time)

Basrah is a village in eastern Yemen. It is located in the Hadhramaut Governorate.
