= Basara, Pirot =

Basara Басара
- Village
- Location within Serbia
- Coordinates: 43°09′24″N 22°40′38″E
- Country: Serbia
- Region: Southern and Eastern Serbia
- District: Pirot
- Municipality: Pirot

Population (2002)
  - Total: 8
- Time zone: UTC+1 (CET)
  - Summer (DST): UTC+2 (CEST)

Basara is a village in the municipality of Pirot, Serbia. According to the 2002 census, the village has a population of 8 people.
