= Kelme =

Kelme may refer to:

- Kelmė, a town in Lithuania
- Kelme (company), a Spanish firm that manufactures sport shoes and clothing
- Kelme (cycling team), a professional cycling team sponsored by the Spanish firm, active from 1980 to 2006
- Quilme people, who call themselves Kélm(e)

== See also ==
- Barsakelmes (disambiguation), including Barsa-Kelmes
- KELM (disambiguation)
