= Barsa-Kelmes =

Former island in the defunct Aral Sea

Coordinates: 45°38′N 59°52′E

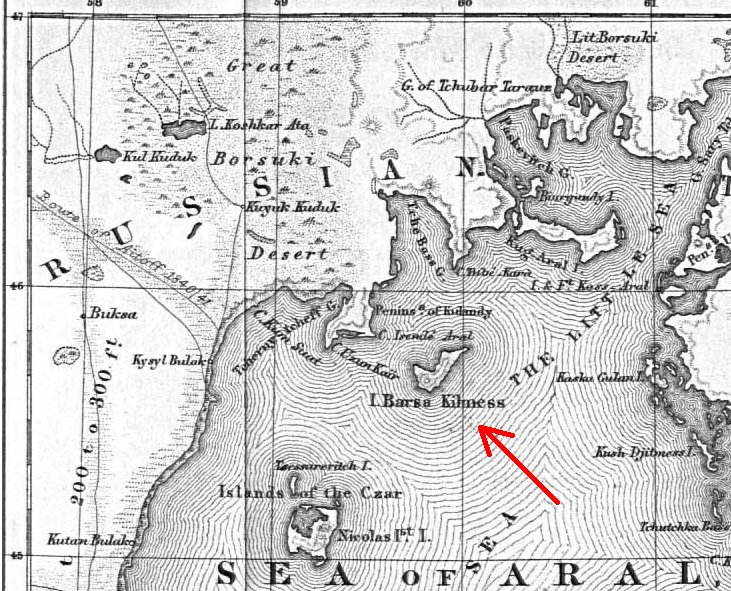
Detail of 1853 map of the Aral Sea (from the Journal of the Royal Geographical Society, Vol. 23, 1853, to accompany "Survey of the Sea of Aral by Commander A. Butakoff, Imperial Russian Navy, 1848 & 1849")

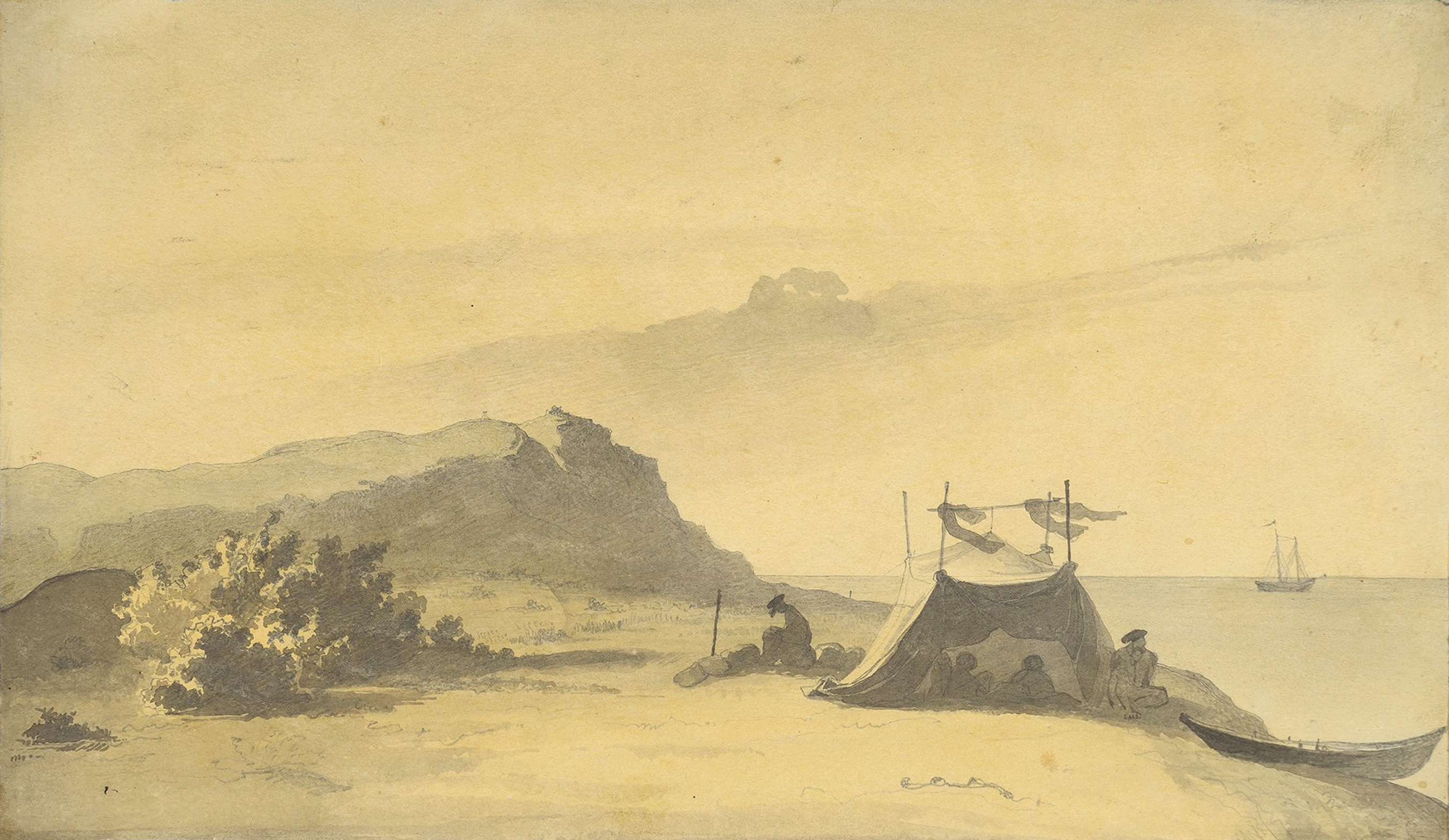
Taras Shevchenko: Tent of the expedition on the island of Barsa-Kelmes, 1848

Barsa-Kelmes (Russian: Барсакельмес, Kazakh: Барсакелмес, Barsakelmes meaning "the place of no return") was an island, the largest in the Aral Sea. Its area was 133 km^{2} in the 1980s, but as the sea became more shallow it steadily grew, until in the 1990s it ceased to be an island. Its highest altitude was 113 m.

"Barsa-Kelmes" literally means 'if-go come-not'; i.e., 'if you go there you won't come back'. It was given such a name because of a number of stories of people (or groups of people) returning years or even decades after going to the island, thinking they had been gone only 2 or 3 days.

It encompasses the Barsa-Kelmes Nature Reserve. Because of the native salt deposits, visitors are recommended to close their eyes during dust storms and strong winds.

== History ==
The first recorded survey of Barsa-Kelmes was made in August 1848, when Geographer A. Maksheyev and topographer A. Akishev made a topographical survey of the island and described its landscape. The first sketches of the local flora and fauna were made by Taras Shevchenko.

A jumping spider, Sitticus barsakelmes, was named after the island in 1998.

=== Urban legend ===
During the second half of the 20th century, there was a persistent urban legend about paranormal phenomena occurring on the island. The legend reached its peak in the early 1990s, when popular science magazine Tekhnika Molodyozhi published a large article about these phenomena, listing local medical student Sergey Lukyanenko as their chief source. It told an engaging story of variable flow of time on the island and possible UFO visitation, and featured letters and stories from local fishermen about strange temporal variations, disappearing expeditions, and other mysteries.

It was later revealed, however, that the legends were a series of elaborate hoaxes perpetrated by successive generations of local writers and journalists, which central publications in the USSR had believed and picked up to boost public interest. The hoax had in fact been first perpetrated and then revealed by Lukyanenko and Grigory Neverov, then president of KLF MGU (KLF = kluba lyubiteley fantastiki, club of fantasy fans), whose involvement started it all. As the story went, when Neverov asked his colleagues throughout the Soviet Union whether they recalled any stories about paranormal phenomena in their regions, Lukyanenko, then an active member of the Almaty KLF, remembered some rumors about mysterious doings on Barsa-Kelmes and decided to play a practical joke on the Muscovite. He found the origin of the rumors, an old story in a local newspaper, together with his friends fabricated the evidences like the letters from fishermen, and even invented a local version of a Kazakh epic about the hero Koblandy Batyr. Neverov bought into a story and reported it to the TM editorial staff, who published the article. Later, when Lukyanenko admitted the hoax to Neverov, they tried to trace the origin of the article that had inspired the joke, and found that it itself was a joke by a local journalist.
