= Río Pasto =

River in Colombia

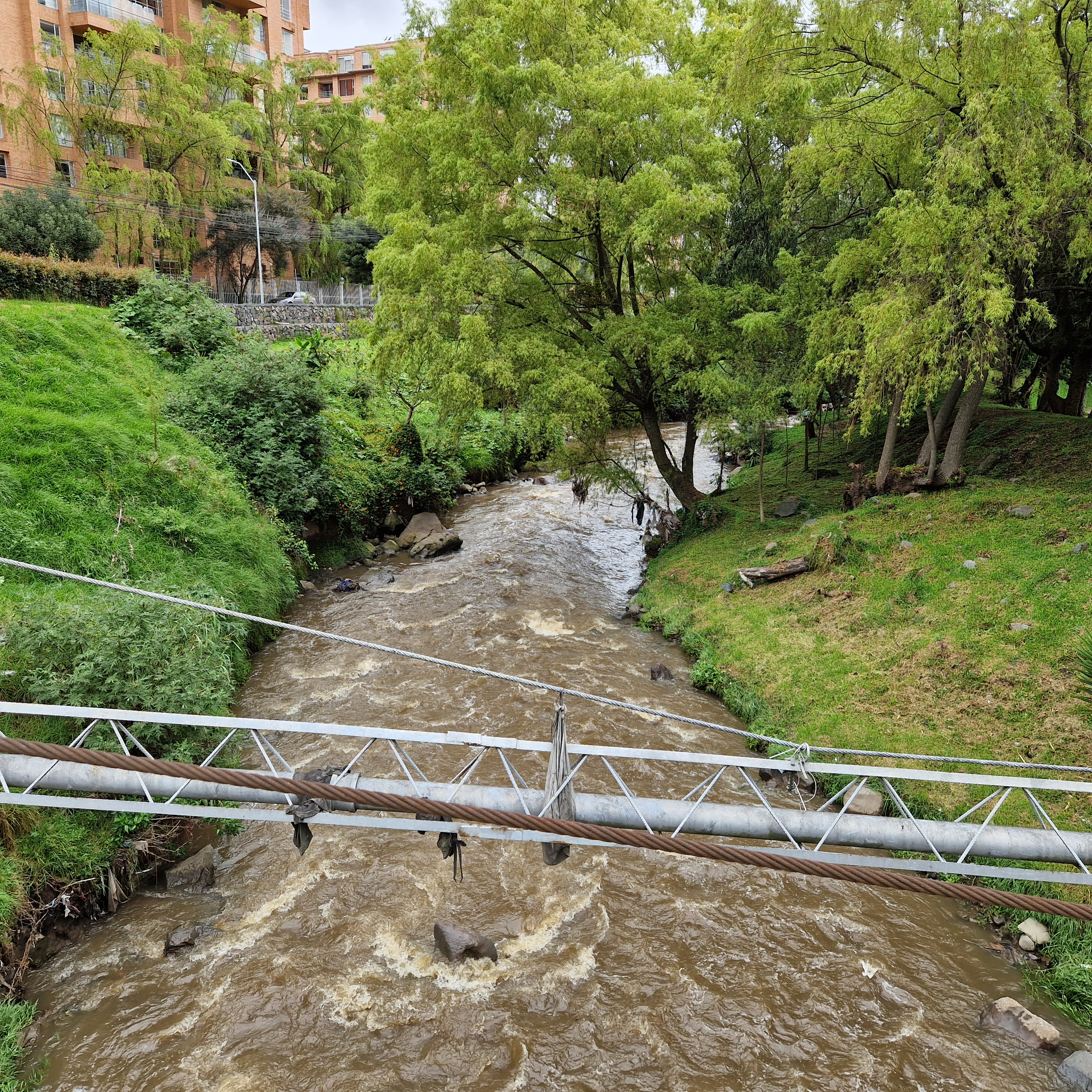
- The Río Pasto as it flows through Pasto

- Location within Colombia
- Location: Nariño Department
- Coordinates: 1°30′2″N 77°19′20″W
- Primary outflows: Río Juanambú
- Basin countries: Colombia

The Río Pasto is an approximately 58-km long left tributary of the Río Juanambú in the Nariño Department in southern Colombia. It rises on the western edge of the 3600 m high Páramo Bordoncillo. From there it initially flows west. It flows along the north-eastern outskirts of Pasto. The Río Pasto then turns north. It flows west past Antonio Nariño Airport and finally flows into the Río Juanambú at an altitude of about 800 m. The Río Pasto passes the city of Pasto and is heavily polluted in the process.
