= Lake island =

Island located in a lake

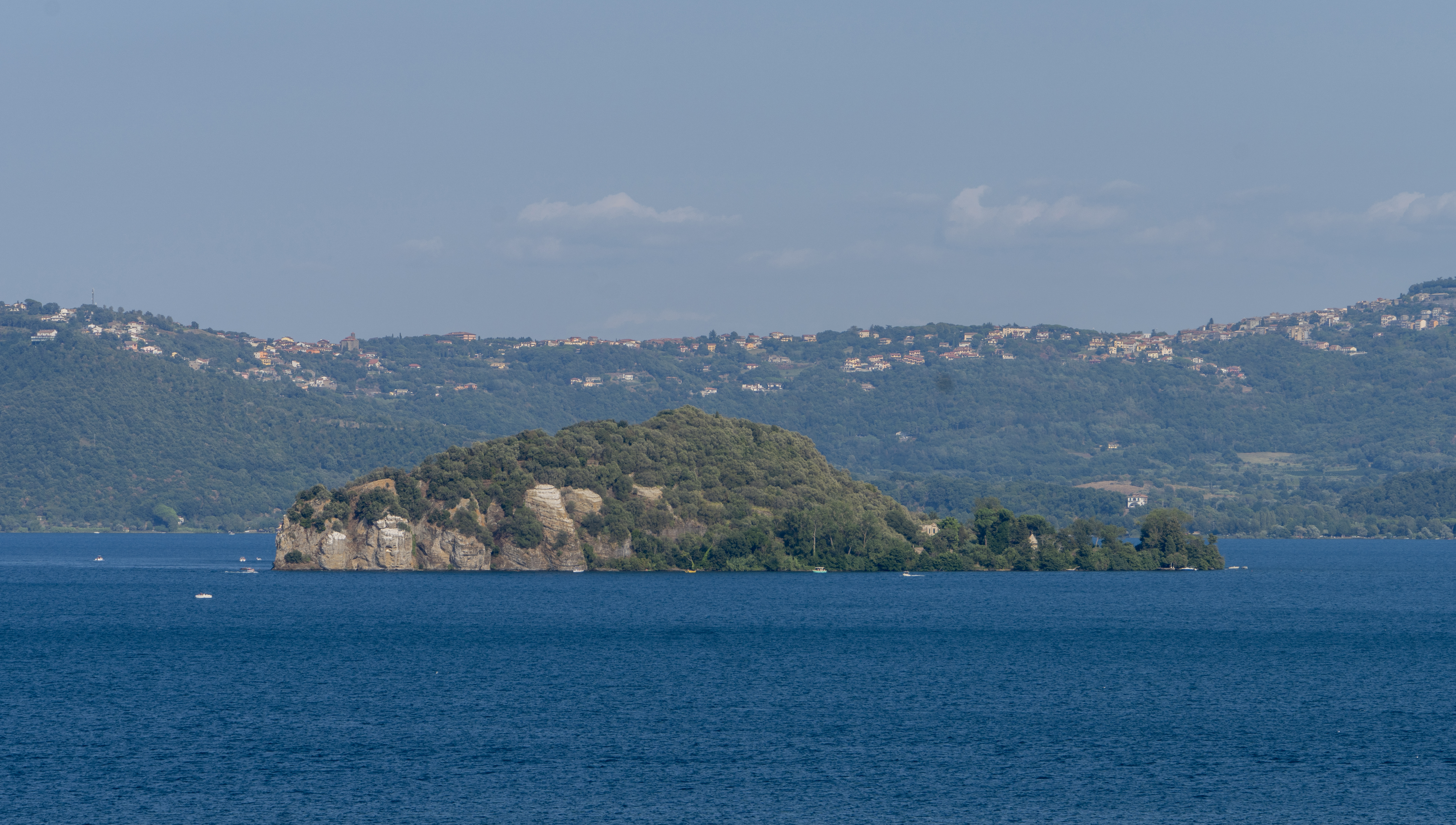
Martana Island in Lake Bolsena, Italy

A lake island is any landmass within a lake. It is a type of inland island. Lake islands may form a lake archipelago.

== Formation ==
Lake islands may form in numerous ways. They may occur through a build-up of sedimentation as shoals, and become true islands through changes in the level of the lake. They may have been originally part of the lake's shore, and been separated from it by erosion, or they may have been left as pinnacles when the lake formed through a raising in the level of a river or other waterway (either naturally, or artificially through the damming of a river or lake). On creation of a glacial lake a moraine can form an island. They may also have formed through earthquake, meteor, or volcanic activity. In the latter case, crater or caldera islands exist, with new volcanic prominences in lakes formed in the craters of larger volcanoes. Other lake islands include ephemeral beds of floating vegetation, and islands artificially formed by human activity.

=== Volcanic crater and caldera lake islands ===
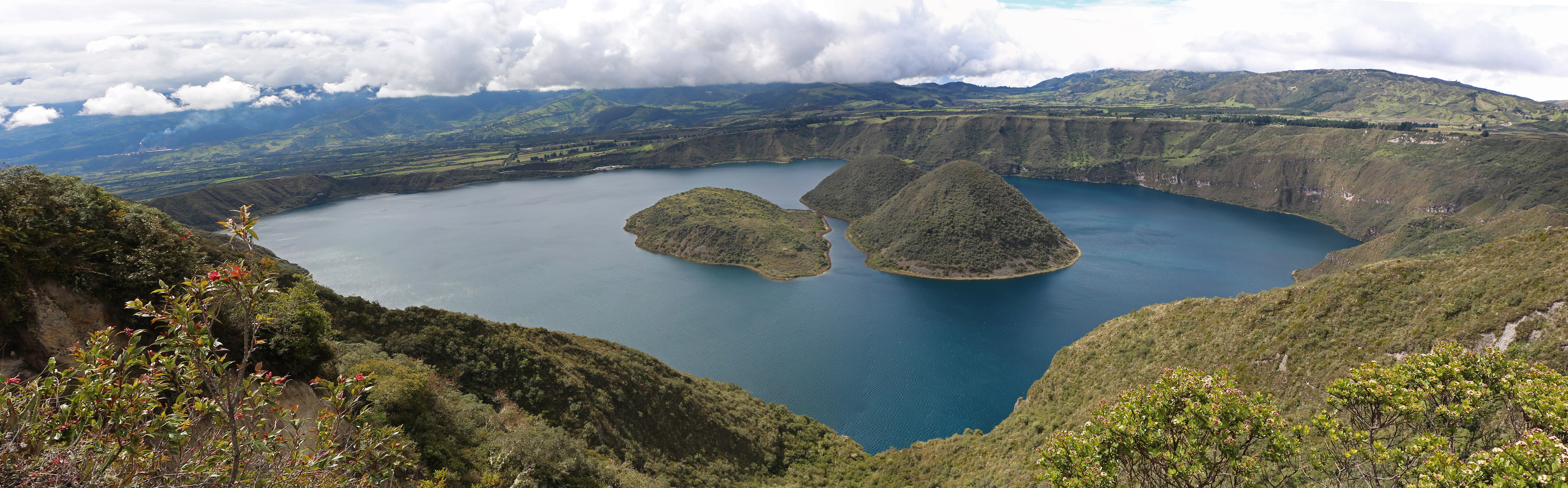
Caldera of Cuicocha in Ecuador

Lakes may sometimes form in the circular depressions of volcanic craters. These craters are typically circular or oval basins around the vent or vents from which magma erupts. A large volcanic eruption sometimes results in the formation of a caldera, caused by the collapse of the magma chamber under the volcano. If enough magma is ejected, the emptied chamber is unable to support the weight of the volcano, and a roughly circular fracture, the ring fault, develops around the edge of the chamber. The centre of the volcano within the ring fracture collapses, creating a ring-shaped depression. Long after the eruption, this caldera may fill with water to become a lake. If volcanic activity continues or restarts, the centre of the caldera may be uplifted in the form of a resurgent dome, to become a crater lake island. Though typically calderas are larger and deeper than craters and form in different ways, a distinction between the two is often ignored in non-technical circumstances and the term crater lake is widely used for the lakes formed in both craters and calderas. The following is a list of large or notable crater lake islands:

- La Corota Island Flora Sanctuary in the Laguna de la Cocha, Colombia
- Teodoro Wolf and Yerovi Islands in Cuicocha Lake, Ecuador
- Teopan Island in Lake Coatepeque, El Salvador
- Islas Quemadas in Lake Ilopango, El Salvador
- Samosir Island in Lake Toba, Sumatra, Indonesia
- Bisentina and Martana Islands in Lake Bolsena, Italy
- Kamuishu Island in Lake Mashū, Hokkaidō, Japan
- Nakano Island in Lake Tōya, Hokkaidō, Japan
- Mokoia Island in Lake Rotorua, North Island, New Zealand
- Motutaiko Island in Lake Taupō, North Island, New Zealand
- Two islands in Lake Dakataua, in the caldera of Dakataua, West New Britain Province, Papua New Guinea
- Volcano Island in Taal Lake, Luzon, Philippines (and Vulcan Point in Crater Lake on Volcano Island)
- Samang, Chayachy, Serdtse (Heart), Nizkii (Low), and Glinyanii (Clay) Islands in Kurile Lake, Kamchatka, Russia
- Lahi, Molemole, Si'i, and A'ali Islands in Lake Vai Lahi, Niuafo'ou, Tonga
- Meke Dağı Island in Meke Golu crater lake, Turkey
- Horseshoe Island (now submerged) in Mount Katmai's crater lake, Alaska, United States
- Wizard Island and Phantom Ship in Crater Lake, Oregon, United States

=== Impact crater islands ===
Impact craters, formed by the collision of large meteorites or comets with the Earth, are relatively uncommon, and those which do exist are frequently heavily eroded or deeply buried. Several, however, do contain lakes. Where the impact crater is complex, a central peak emerges from the floor of the crater. If a lake is present, this central peak may break the water's surface as an island. In other cases, other geological processes may have caused only a ring-shaped annular lake to remain from an impact, with a large central island taking up the remaining area of the crater. The world's largest impact crater island (and the world's second-largest lake island of any kind) is René-Levasseur Island, in Lake Manicouagan, Canada. The Sanshan Islands of Lake Tai, China, are also examples of impact crater islands, as are the islands in Canada's Clearwater Lakes, and the Slate Islands of Lake Superior, also in Canada. Sollerön Island in Siljan Lake, Sweden, and an unnamed island in Lake Karakul, Tajikistan, was also formed by meteor impact.

=== Floating islands ===
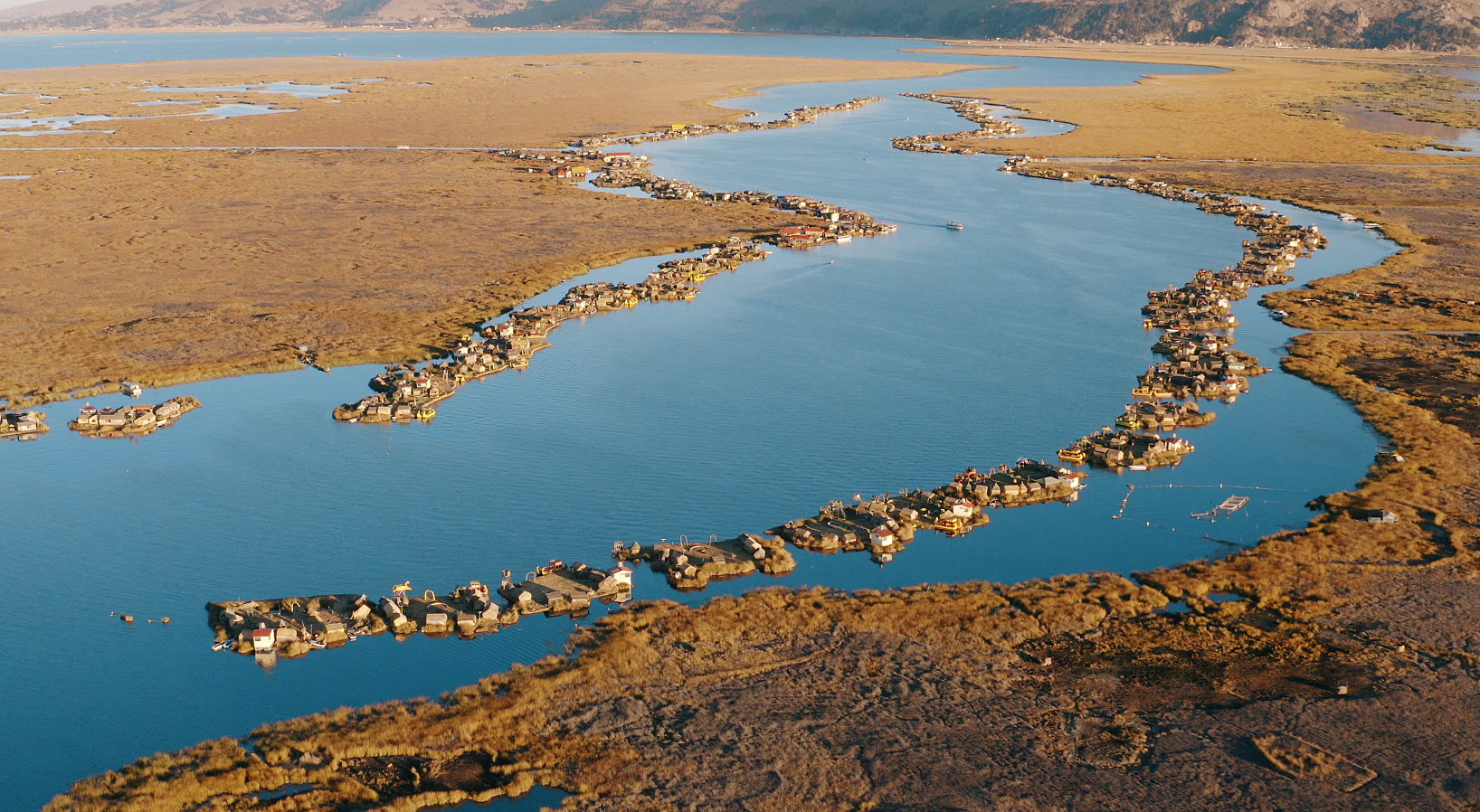
The Uru people have lived on the Uros floating islands on Lake Titicaca for centuries

The term floating island is sometimes used for accumulations of vegetation free-floating within a body of water. Due to the lack of currents and tides, these are more frequently found in lakes than in rivers or the open sea. Peaty masses of vegetable matter from shallow lake floors may rise due to the accumulation of gases during decomposition, and will often float for a considerable time, becoming ephemeral islands until the gas has dissipated enough for the vegetation to return to the lake floor.

=== Artificial islands ===
Artificial or man-made islands are islands constructed by human activity rather than formed by natural means. They may be totally created by humans, enlarged from existing islands or reefs, formed by joining small existing islands, or cut from a mainland (for example, by cutting through the isthmus of a peninsula). Artificial islands have a long history, dating back to the crannogs of prehistoric Britain and Ireland, and the traditional floating Uru islands of Lake Titicaca in South America. Notable early artificial islands include the Aztec city of Tenochtitlan, at the site of modern Mexico City. Though technically caused by human activity, islands formed from hilltops by the deliberate flooding of valleys (such as in the creation of hydroelectricity projects and reservoirs) are not normally regarded as artificial islands.

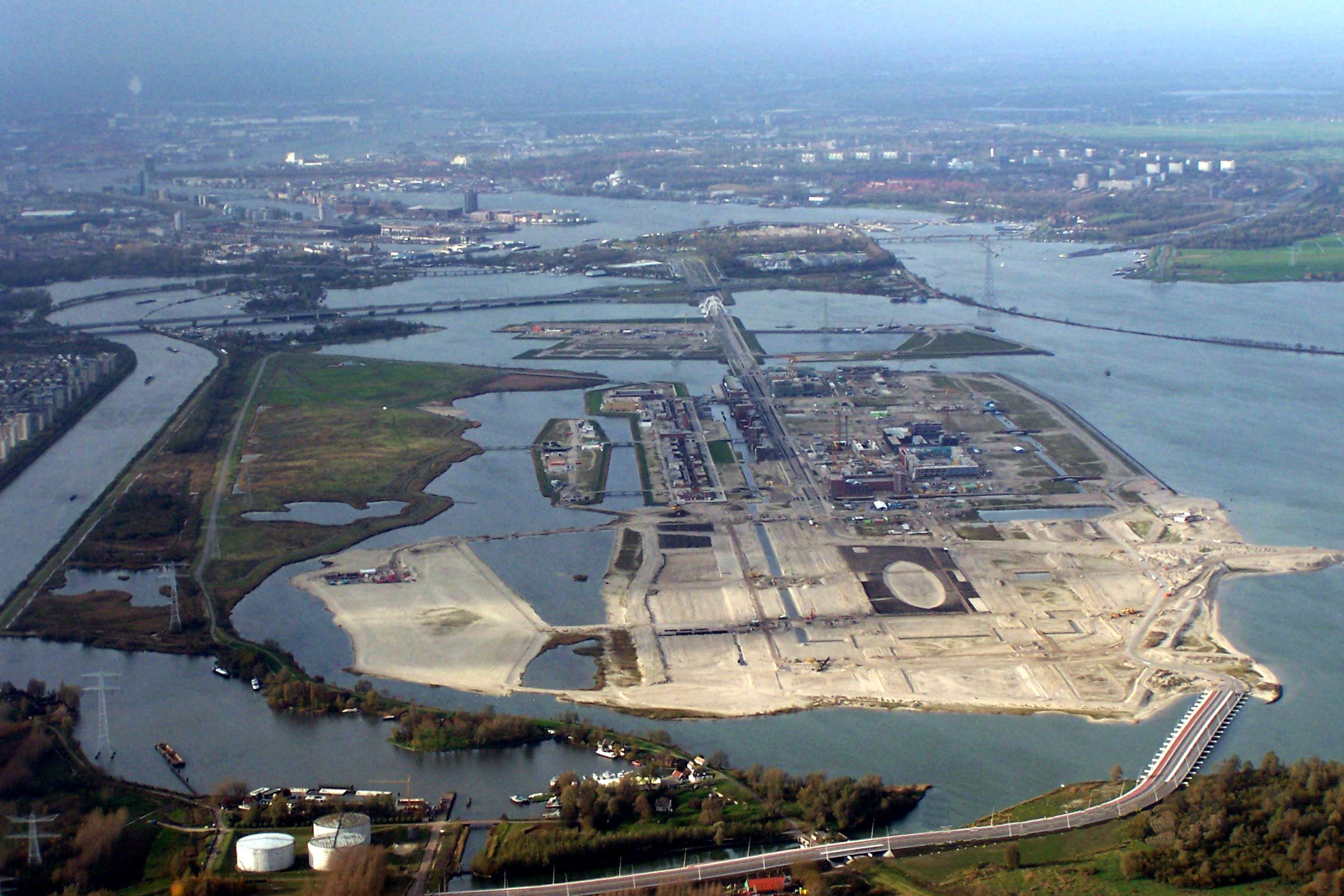
The artificial island of IJburg, Amsterdam, Netherlands

Artificial islands are built for numerous uses, ranging from flood protection to immigration or quarantine stations. Other uses for reclaimed artificial islands include expansion of living space or transportation centres in densely populated regions. Agricultural land has also been developed through reclamation of polders in the Netherlands and other low lying countries.

Notable modern examples of artificial lake islands include the Dutch polder of Flevopolder in Flevoland, the island of IJburg in Amsterdam, and Flamingo Island in Kamfers Dam, South Africa. At 948 km^{2} (366 sq mi), Flevopolder, in the now-freshwater lake IJsselmeer, is the largest man-made island in the world.

=== Former islands ===
A number of lake islands have disappeared for various reasons. Many lakes have been shrinking, so that some of their islands have become attached to or part of the mainland, such as Vozrozhdeniya Island, Kokaral, Barsa-Kelmes, and others in the Aral Sea; the Bogomerom Archipelago and others in Lake Chad; Shahi Island and others in Lake Urmia; and many others around the world.

Other islands are lost by sinking below the lake surface, either by erosion, subsidence, or rising water level. Sunken Island in Otsego Lake is one example. Islands may also be lost by being artificially attached to the mainland, such as Urk in the former Zuider Zee.

== Lists of lake islands ==
=== Naturally occurring lake islands by area ===
There are few naturally occurring lake islands with an area in excess of 270 km^{2} (100 sq mi). Of these, five are located in the large Great Lakes of North America, three are located in the large African Great Lakes, one is located in the largest lake in Central America, one was formed by the world's fourth largest meteorite impact, and one is located in the largest (by volume) lake in the world.

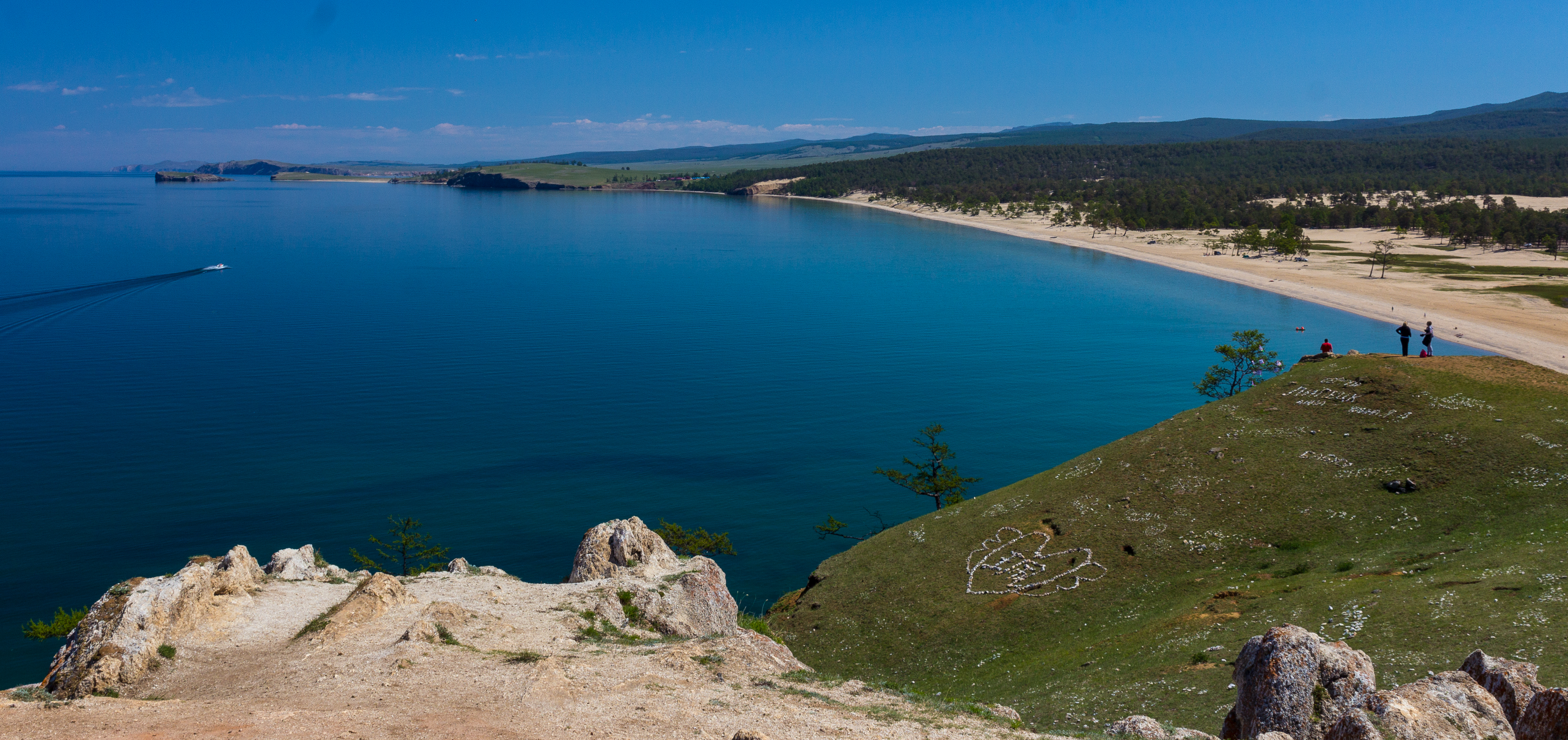
Coast of Olkhon Island on Lake Baikal

1. Manitoulin Island in Lake Huron, Canada – 2,766 km^{2} (1,068 sq mi)
2. René-Levasseur Island in the Manicouagan Reservoir, Quebec, Canada – 2,000 km^{2} (770 sq mi). It became an artificial island when the Manicouagan Reservoir was flooded in 1970, merging Mouchalagane Lake on the western side and Manicouagan Lake on the eastern side.
3. Sääminginsalo in Saimaa Lake, Finland – 1,069 km^{2} (413 sq mi)
4. Olkhon in Lake Baikal, Russia – 730 km^{2} (280 sq mi)
5. Isle Royale in Lake Superior, United States – 541 km^{2} (209 sq mi)
6. Ukerewe Island in Lake Victoria, Tanzania – 530 km^{2} (200 sq mi)
7. St. Joseph Island in Lake Huron, Canada – 365 km^{2} (141 sq mi)
8. Drummond Island in Lake Huron, United States – 347 km^{2} (134 sq mi)
9. Idjwi in Lake Kivu, Democratic Republic of the Congo – 285 km^{2} (110 sq mi)
10. Ometepe Island in Lake Nicaragua, Nicaragua – 276 km^{2} (107 sq mi)
11. Bugala Island in Lake Victoria, Uganda – 275 km^{2} (106 sq mi)
12. St. Ignace Island in Lake Superior, Canada – 274 km^{2} (106 sq mi)

Note:

- Soisalo, a 1,638 km^{2} (632 sq mi) body of land in Finland that is surrounded by individual lakes (Kallavesi, Suvasvesi, Kermajärvi, Ruokovesi, Haukivesi and Unnukka) connected by creeks and rivers – rather than sitting within an individual lake – was suggested in a 1987 study as an island, due to being effectively "surrounded by water". Other scientists rebut this claim, noting that the waters surrounding Soisalo are not on the same level, with elevation differences up to 6 m (20 ft) between the surrounding lakes, and does not meet the criteria of a true island.
- Samosir, a 630 km^{2} (240 sq mi) body of land in Lake Toba, Indonesia, is a peninsula that is technically surrounded by water only because a canal was built across it, effectively separating it from the mainland. For this reason, it is not a naturally occurring lake island.

=== Other lake islands larger than 80 km^{2} (31 mi^{2}) ===
- Big Simpson Island in Great Slave Lake, Canada – 251 km^{2} (97 sq mi)
- Blanchet Island in Great Slave Lake, Canada – 240 km^{2} (93 sq mi)
- Rubondo Island in Lake Victoria, Tanzania – 237 km^{2} (92 sq mi)
- Buvuma Island in Lake Victoria, Uganda – 230 km^{2} (89 sq mi)
- The largest island in Sobradinho Reservoir, Brazil – 200 km^{2} (77 sq mi)
- Glover Island in Grand Lake, Canada – 191 km^{2} (74 sq mi)
- Michipicoten Island in Lake Superior, Canada – 181 km^{2} (70 sq mi)
- Preble Island in Great Slave Lake, Canada – 179 km^{2} (69 sq mi)
- Cockburn Island in Lake Huron, Canada – 175 km^{2} (68 sq mi)
- Hurissalo in Lietvesi, Finland – 174 km^{2} (67 sq mi)
- Partalansaari in Haapaselkä, Finland – 170 km^{2} (66 sq mi)
- Teresa Island in Atlin Lake, Canada - 159.35 km^{2} (61.53 sq mi)
- Hecla Island in Lake Winnipeg, Canada – 151 km^{2} (58 sq mi)
- Beaver Island in Lake Michigan, United States – 144 km^{2} (56 sq mi)
- Sugar Island in Lake Nicolet – Lake George, United States – 130 km^{2} (50 sq mi)
- Wolfe Island in Lake Ontario, Canada – 124 km^{2} (48 sq mi)
- Viljakansaari in Haapaselkä, Finland – 115 km^{2} (44 sq mi)
- Antelope Island in the Great Salt Lake, United States – 110 km^{2} (42 sq mi)
- Black Island in Lake Winnipeg, Canada – 105 km^{2} (41 sq mi)
- Selaön in Mälaren, Sweden – 91 km^{2} (35 sq mi)
- Bois Blanc Island in Lake Huron, United States – 88 km^{2} (34 sq mi)
- Grand Isle in Lake Champlain, United States – 81.9 km^{2} (31.6 sq mi)
- Ukara Island in Lake Victoria, Tanzania – 81 km^{2} (31 sq mi)

=== Islands within lakes recursively ===
- The largest lake on an island is Nettilling Lake on Baffin Island, Canada – 5,542 km^{2} (2,140 sq mi).
- The largest island in a lake is Manitoulin Island in Lake Huron, Canada – 2,766 km^{2} (1,068 sq mi).
- The largest island in a lake on an island is Samosir (a peninsula that is technically "surrounded by water" only because a narrow canal was built across it) in Danau Toba on Sumatra – 630 km^{2} (240 sq mi).
- The largest lake on an island in a lake is Lake Manitou on Manitoulin Island in Lake Huron – 104 km^{2} (40 sq mi).
- The largest lake on an island in a lake on an island is a nameless, approximately 152-hectare (375-acre) lake at 66.387°N 69.645°W which is, itself, on a nameless island in Nettilling Lake on Baffin Island, Canada.
- The largest island in a lake on an island in a lake is Treasure Island in Mindemoya Lake on Manitoulin Island in Lake Huron.
- The largest island in a lake on an island in a lake on an island is a nameless, approximately 4.0-hectare (10-acre) island at 66.687°N 70.479°W, situated within Nettilling Lake on Baffin Island, Canada.

=== Notable island systems and former lake islands ===
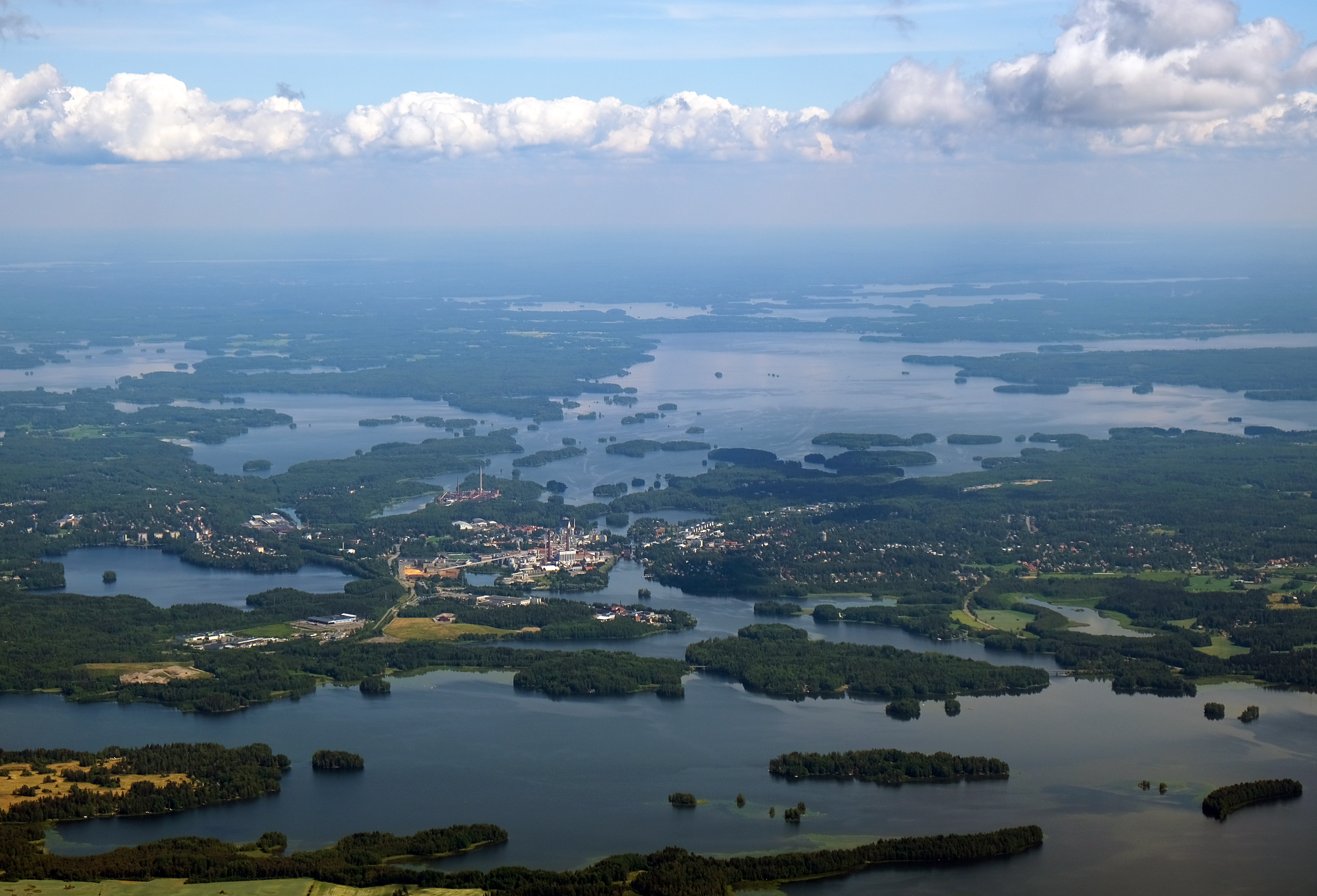
Vanajavesi with its several lake islands in Finland

- Vozrozhdeniya Island in the Aral Sea, Kazakhstan and Uzbekistan – 2,300 km^{2} (890 sq mi). Originally only 200 square kilometres (77 sq mi), the island grew rapidly from the 1960s until mid-2001, as the shrinking of the Aral Sea caused the water to recede from the land around the original island, until the moment when that same process caused the expanded island to connect to the mainland. By 2014, what used to be an island had become merely a part of the extensive Aralkum Desert.
- Sääminginsalo in Saimaa, Finland – 1,069 km^{2} (413 sq mi). Saimaa is sometimes referred to as a "lake system", and Sääminginsalo is surrounded by three separately named lakes (Haukivesi, Puruvesi and Pihlajavesi) that are at the same level, and by an artificial canal, Raikuun kanava, built in the 1750s. Since it is only separated from other land by a canal, it is debatable whether Sääminginsalo can be considered an island.
- The Pamvotida lake, next to the city of Ioannina, Greece - 19.4 km^{2} (7.5 sq mi), has an island with a village. The name of the village is "Nisos", which is the Greek word for island. The village has 219 permanent residents according to the 2011 census. The size of the island is 0.52 km^{2} (0.20 sq mi).
- Lake Taal on the island of Luzon in the Philippines features Volcano Island, which in turn has its own lake, Main Crater Lake. This lake features the amalgamation of cinder cones and craters known as Vulcan Point, making it one of the few known third-order recursive lake-islands.

=== Islands in artificial lakes ===
- Islands of Lake Argyle, some seventy named islands in Lake Argyle, Australia

== See also ==
- Lists of islands (by ocean, sea, lake or river)
- Recursive islands and lakes
- River island
