= Fundación Doctora Clown =

Colombian foundation

The Fundación Doctora Clown is a Colombian foundation that works with artists, actors, and musicians to entertain children while they are in the hospital. It was founded in 1998, and it conducts regular visits to hospitals in Bogotá, Bucaramanga, Cali, Cartagena, Barranquilla, Medellín, Pasto and many other cities in Colombia.
