= Chachagüí =

Coordinates: 1°21.63′N 77°17.01′W

- Municipality and town
- Flag

- Location of the municipality and town of Chachagüí in the Nariño Department of Colombia.
- Country: Colombia
- Department: Nariño Department

Area
  - Total: 148 km^{2} (57 sq mi)

Population (Census 2018)
  - Total: 12,419
  - Density: 83.9/km^{2} (217/sq mi)
- Time zone: UTC-5 (Colombia Standard Time)

Chachagüí (Spanish pronunciation: [tʃatʃaˈɣwi]) is a town and municipality in the Nariño Department, Colombia. The municipality is home to Antonio Nariño Airport, the most important in the region and a means of air access to San Juan de Pasto, the department's capital.

== Climate ==
Chachagüí experiences a consistently warm and mild subtropical highland climate (Köppen: Cfb). July and August are fairly dry, while the rest of the year experiences significant rainfall.

Climate data for Chachagüí (Antonio Nariño Airport), elevation 1,816 m (5,958 ft), (1981–2010)
Month	Jan	Feb	Mar	Apr	May	Jun	Jul	Aug	Sep	Oct	Nov	Dec	Year
Mean daily maximum °C (°F)	22.9 (73.2)	23.3 (73.9)	23.4 (74.1)	23.4 (74.1)	23.7 (74.7)	24.3 (75.7)	24.9 (76.8)	25.6 (78.1)	25.3 (77.5)	23.6 (74.5)	22.5 (72.5)	22.4 (72.3)	23.8 (74.8)
Daily mean °C (°F)	18.7 (65.7)	19.0 (66.2)	19.1 (66.4)	19.1 (66.4)	19.3 (66.7)	19.6 (67.3)	19.8 (67.6)	20.2 (68.4)	19.8 (67.6)	18.9 (66.0)	18.4 (65.1)	18.4 (65.1)	19.2 (66.6)
Mean daily minimum °C (°F)	14.6 (58.3)	14.8 (58.6)	15.0 (59.0)	15.1 (59.2)	15.2 (59.4)	14.8 (58.6)	14.5 (58.1)	14.7 (58.5)	14.5 (58.1)	14.6 (58.3)	14.7 (58.5)	14.8 (58.6)	14.8 (58.6)
Average precipitation mm (inches)	99.4 (3.91)	89.9 (3.54)	128.0 (5.04)	153.9 (6.06)	122.1 (4.81)	53.9 (2.12)	33.7 (1.33)	20.1 (0.79)	63.4 (2.50)	146.9 (5.78)	161.4 (6.35)	127.7 (5.03)	1,200.4 (47.26)
Average precipitation days	15	14	18	19	18	12	8	8	11	18	20	18	178
Average relative humidity (%)	81	80	80	82	81	74	66	63	69	80	84	84	77
Mean monthly sunshine hours	167.4	141.2	139.5	141.0	161.2	183.0	207.7	207.7	171.0	161.2	153.0	161.2	1,995.1
Mean daily sunshine hours	5.4	5.0	4.5	4.7	5.2	6.1	6.7	6.7	5.7	5.2	5.1	5.2	5.5
Source: Instituto de Hidrologia Meteorologia y Estudios Ambientales
