= La Corota Island Flora Sanctuary =

National park in Colombia

- IUCN category II (national park)
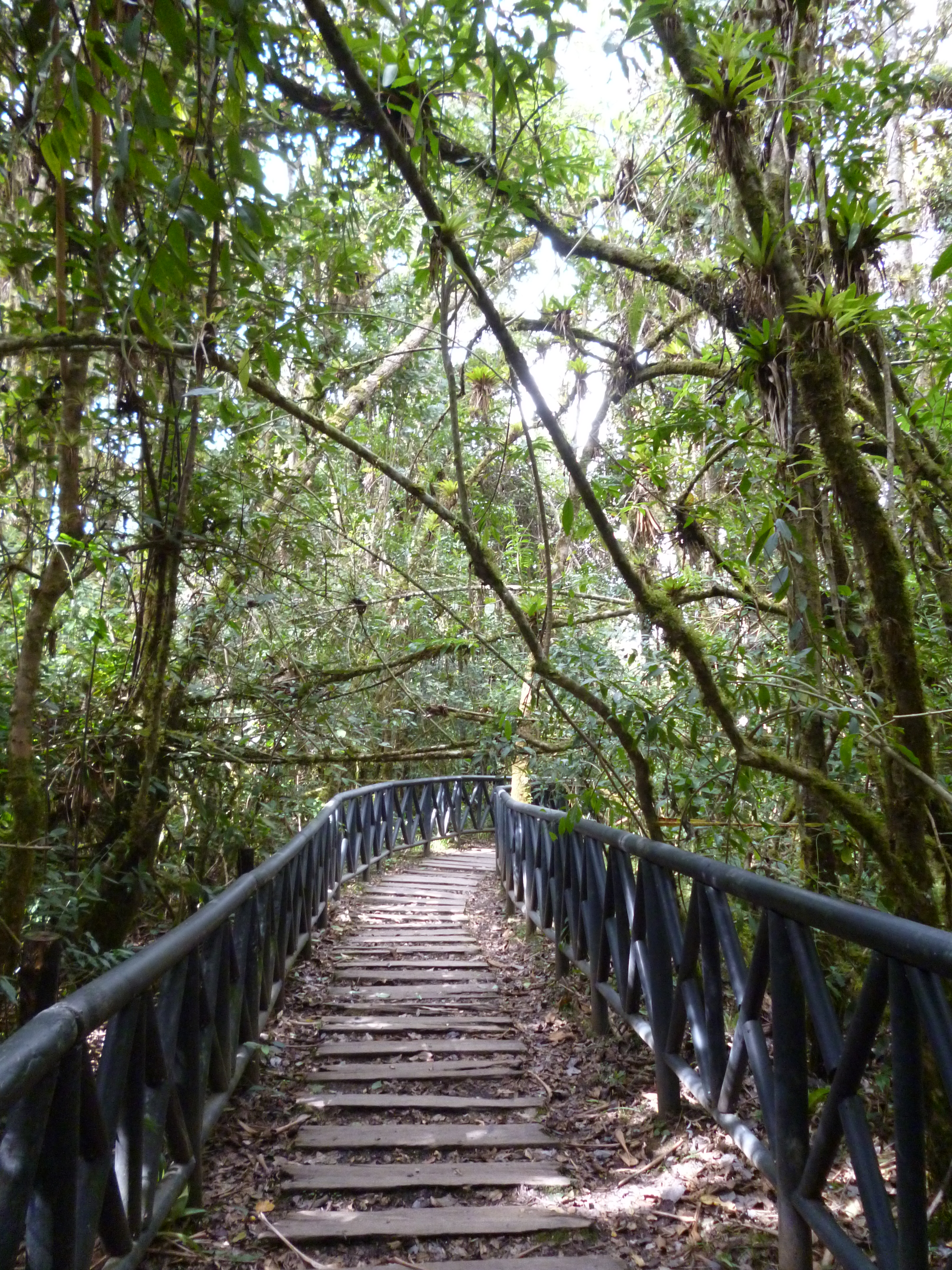
- Boardwalk within La Corota Island Flora Sanctuary
- Interactive map of La Corota Island Flora Sanctuary
- Location: La Corota Island, Laguna de la Cocha, Nariño, Colombia
- Nearest city: Pasto, Nariño
- Coordinates: 01°07′48″N 77°09′00″W
- Area: 37.6 acres (15.2 ha)
- Established: June 6, 1977
- Visitors: 28,000 (in 2018)
- Governing body: SINAP
- Website: Santuario de Flora Isla de la Corota

Ramsar Wetland
- Designated: 8 January 2001
- Reference no.: 1047

La Corota Island Flora Sanctuary (Spanish: Santuario de Flora Isla de la Corota) is the smallest protected area of the Colombian National Natural Park System, covering just under 16 hectares of land and surrounding water area. Located on the Laguna de la Cocha, the flora sanctuary serves as a natural habitat for endemic sub-tropical Andean cloud forest plant species as well as a number of waterfowl, amphibians, and fish. Established as a flora and fauna sanctuary on June 6, 1977, La Corota Island has become one of the most visited national parks in Colombia having recorded 28,000 individual visitors in 2018.

== Geography and climate ==
Located in western Colombia, La Corota Island is the only lake island with old-growth Andean forest in the country. The sanctuary covers the entirety of the island and four hectares of surrounding water area.

== Flora and fauna ==
=== Flora ===
- Hieronyma macrocarpa
- Eugenia stipitata
- Befaria glauca
- Hesperomeles glabrata
- Drymis granantesis

=== Mammals ===
- Soft-furred Oldfield mouse
- Chiroptera

=== Birds ===
- Fulica ardesiaca
- Pied-billed grebe
- Black-crowned night heron
- Rufous-collared sparrow
- Red-crested cotinga
- Great thrush
- Glossy-black thrush
- Spectacled whitestart
- Golden-fronted whitestart
- Slaty brushfinch
- Sparkling violetear
- Collared inca

== Activities ==
La Corota Island Flora Sanctuary offers research and recreational opportunities for its visitors. Despite its size, the island accounts for two hiking trails, the 550-meter El Quiche trail and the 200-meter La Totora trail. In addition, La Corota Island is renowned as a birdwatching and ecotourism destination.
