= Laguna de la Cocha =

La Cocha Lagoon
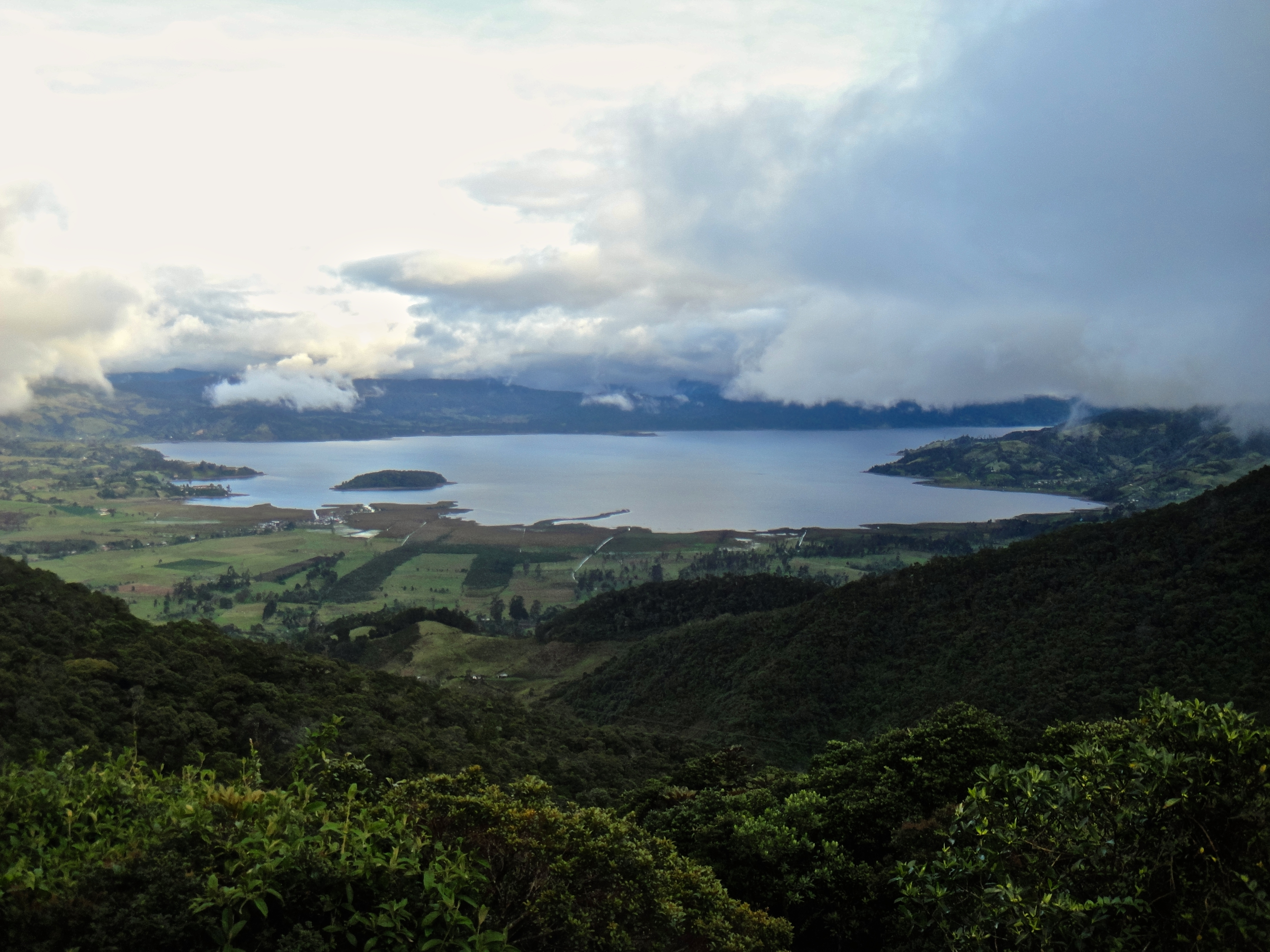
- La Cocha, with La Corota Island, from an overlook stop

- Location within Colombia
- Location: Nariño, Colombia
- Coordinates: 01°06′00″N 77°09′07″W
- Type: Volcanic crater lake
- Primary outflows: Guamués River, Putumayo River
- Basin countries: Amazon basin
- Surface area: 40.5 km^{2} (15.6 sq mi)
- Surface elevation: 2,680 m (8,790 ft)
- Islands: La Corota Island

Ramsar Wetland
- Designated: 8 January 2001
- Reference no.: 1047

La Cocha Lagoon (Spanish: Laguna de la Cocha) is a 39,000-hectare (96,000-acre) volcanic crater lake located within the Pasto Municipality in Nariño, Colombia.

La Cocha Lagoon is Colombia's second largest inland body of water after Lake Tota in terms of surface area.

== Wildlife ==
La Cocha Lagoon surrounds La Corota Island Flora Sanctuary which is home to mammals such as mountain tapir, northern pudu and spectacled bears, and bird species like grebes, golden peck duck, snipes, and andean ducks.

Important plant species include frailejon, Schoenoplectus californicus, and Juncus effusus.

== Climate ==
Climate data for Laguna de la Cocha (El Encano), elevation 2,830 m (9,280 ft), (1981–2010)
Month	Jan	Feb	Mar	Apr	May	Jun	Jul	Aug	Sep	Oct	Nov	Dec	Year
Mean daily maximum °C (°F)	16.5 (61.7)	16.6 (61.9)	16.3 (61.3)	16.3 (61.3)	15.9 (60.6)	14.8 (58.6)	14.2 (57.6)	14.2 (57.6)	15.2 (59.4)	16.5 (61.7)	16.8 (62.2)	16.8 (62.2)	15.8 (60.4)
Daily mean °C (°F)	12.0 (53.6)	12.0 (53.6)	12.0 (53.6)	12.1 (53.8)	11.9 (53.4)	11.3 (52.3)	10.6 (51.1)	10.5 (50.9)	11.1 (52.0)	11.8 (53.2)	12.2 (54.0)	12.3 (54.1)	11.6 (52.9)
Mean daily minimum °C (°F)	8.4 (47.1)	8.5 (47.3)	8.6 (47.5)	8.8 (47.8)	8.9 (48.0)	8.6 (47.5)	7.8 (46.0)	7.6 (45.7)	7.3 (45.1)	8.0 (46.4)	8.5 (47.3)	8.4 (47.1)	8.3 (46.9)
Average precipitation mm (inches)	85.5 (3.37)	89.3 (3.52)	104.2 (4.10)	142.1 (5.59)	149.0 (5.87)	145.6 (5.73)	136.3 (5.37)	104.2 (4.10)	82.9 (3.26)	100.5 (3.96)	111.0 (4.37)	98.1 (3.86)	1,339.5 (52.74)
Average precipitation days	21	19	23	25	26	26	25	25	23	22	21	22	274
Average relative humidity (%)	85	86	86	87	87	88	88	87	86	85	85	86	86
Mean monthly sunshine hours	99.2	76.2	65.1	60.0	62.0	63.0	65.1	68.2	72.0	89.9	93.0	102.3	916
Mean daily sunshine hours	3.2	2.7	2.1	2.0	2.0	2.1	2.1	2.2	2.4	2.9	3.1	3.3	2.5
Source: Instituto de Hidrologia Meteorologia y Estudios Ambientales
