= Antonio Nariño Airport =

Antonio Nariño Airport Aeropuerto Antonio Nariño
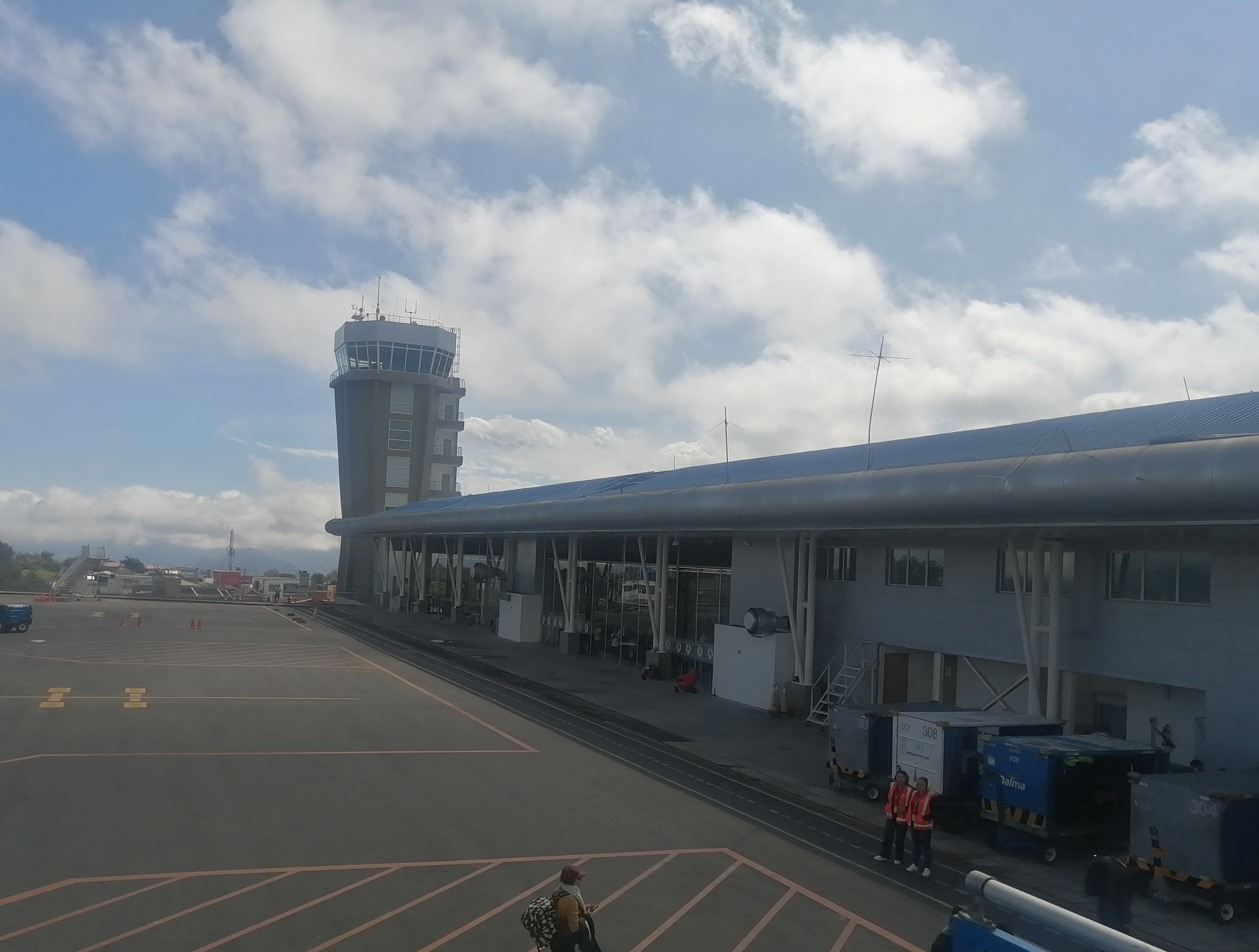
- IATA: PSO; ICAO: SKPS

Summary
- Airport type: Public
- Operator: Aerocivil
- Serves: Pasto, Colombia
- Location: Chachagüí
- Elevation AMSL: 5,951 ft / 1,814 m
- Coordinates: 1°23′45″N 77°17′28″W

Map

Runways
Direction	Length		Surface
Direction	m	ft	Surface
02/20	2,312	7,585	Asphalt

Statistics (2019)
- Passengers movement: 333,631
- Cargo movement: 2,105 T
- Air operations: 5,849
- Sources: WAD GCM

Antonio Nariño Airport (Spanish: Aeropuerto Antonio Nariño, IATA: PSO, ICAO: SKPS) is an airport located in the town of Chachagüí and which serves the city of Pasto in the Nariño Department of Colombia. The airport is 35 kilometres (22 mi) north of Pasto. It handles only domestic flights in addition to military operations and private charters. A new terminal, administrative and tower control were built, also new navigation equipment was set up due to the increasing number of passengers and cargo flights. Usually Airbus 318, 319, 320, Boeing 737, 727, turboprop and different types of smaller aircraft use the airport

The airport was classified as international airport and it serves flights to Esmeraldas, Ecuador. which is operated by Intercontinental de Aviación until the airline ceased its operations in 2010.

== Runway ==
The airport has a table top runway, built on a plateau of 50 meters because of the surrounding terrain. Due to this, many pilots refer to the airport as an aircraft carrier. The runway is also relatively short for the elevation of the airport.

The position of the runway means that it is often rendered unusable, since in the presence of crosswinds, it prevents aircraft making a safe takeoff and landing. Crosswinds are common during the summer, particularly during the month of August.

Since 2007, the runway has been equipped with an instrument landing system (ILS), which permits airport operations during the night and when there is low visibility.

== Airlines and destinations ==
Airlines	Destinations
Avianca	Bogotá, Cali, Medellín–JMC
Clic	Cali
LATAM Colombia	Bogotá

== See also ==
- Transport in Colombia
- List of airports in Colombia
