= Pasto =

San Juan de Pasto Camsá: Bastok
- Municipality and city
- San Juan de Pasto
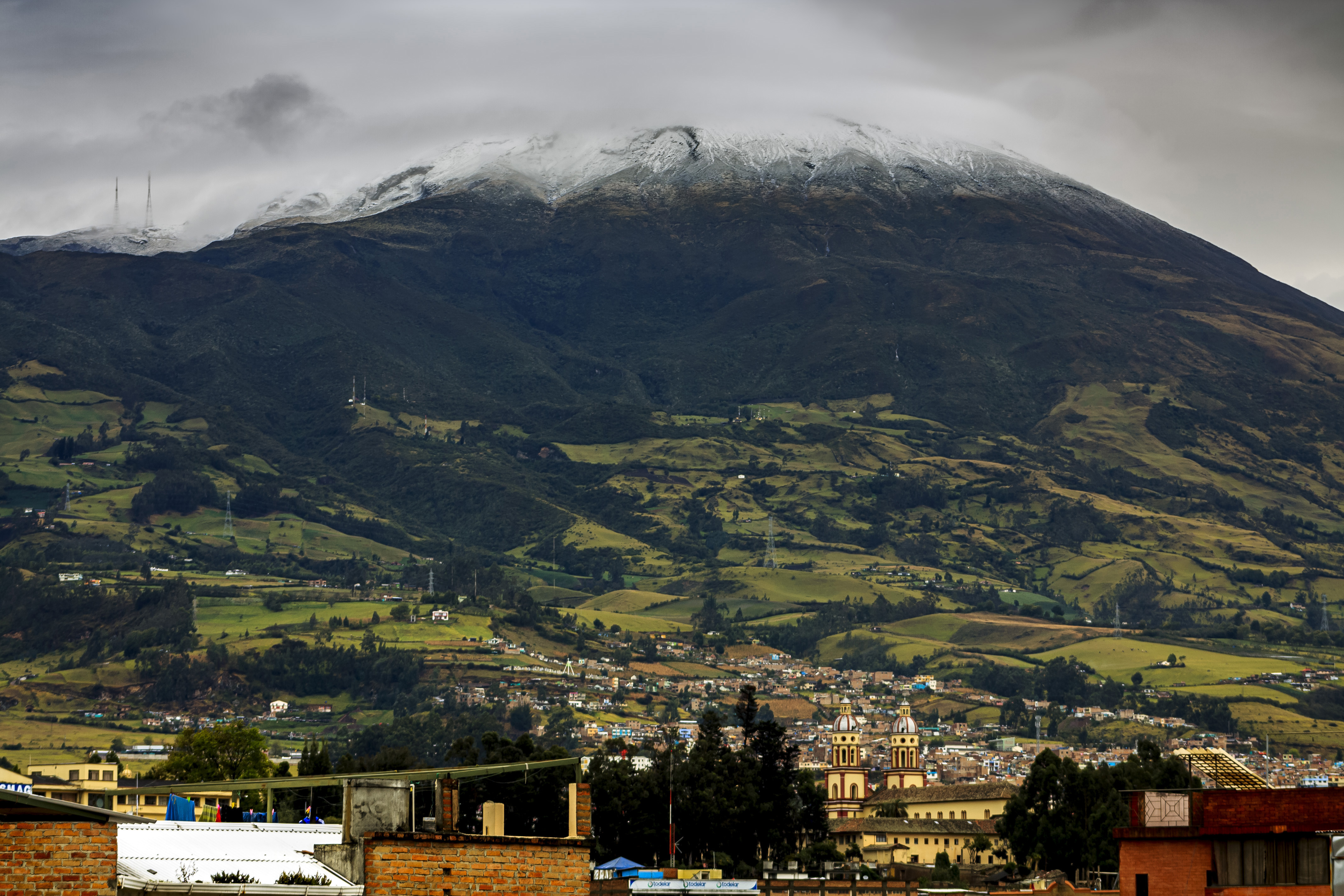
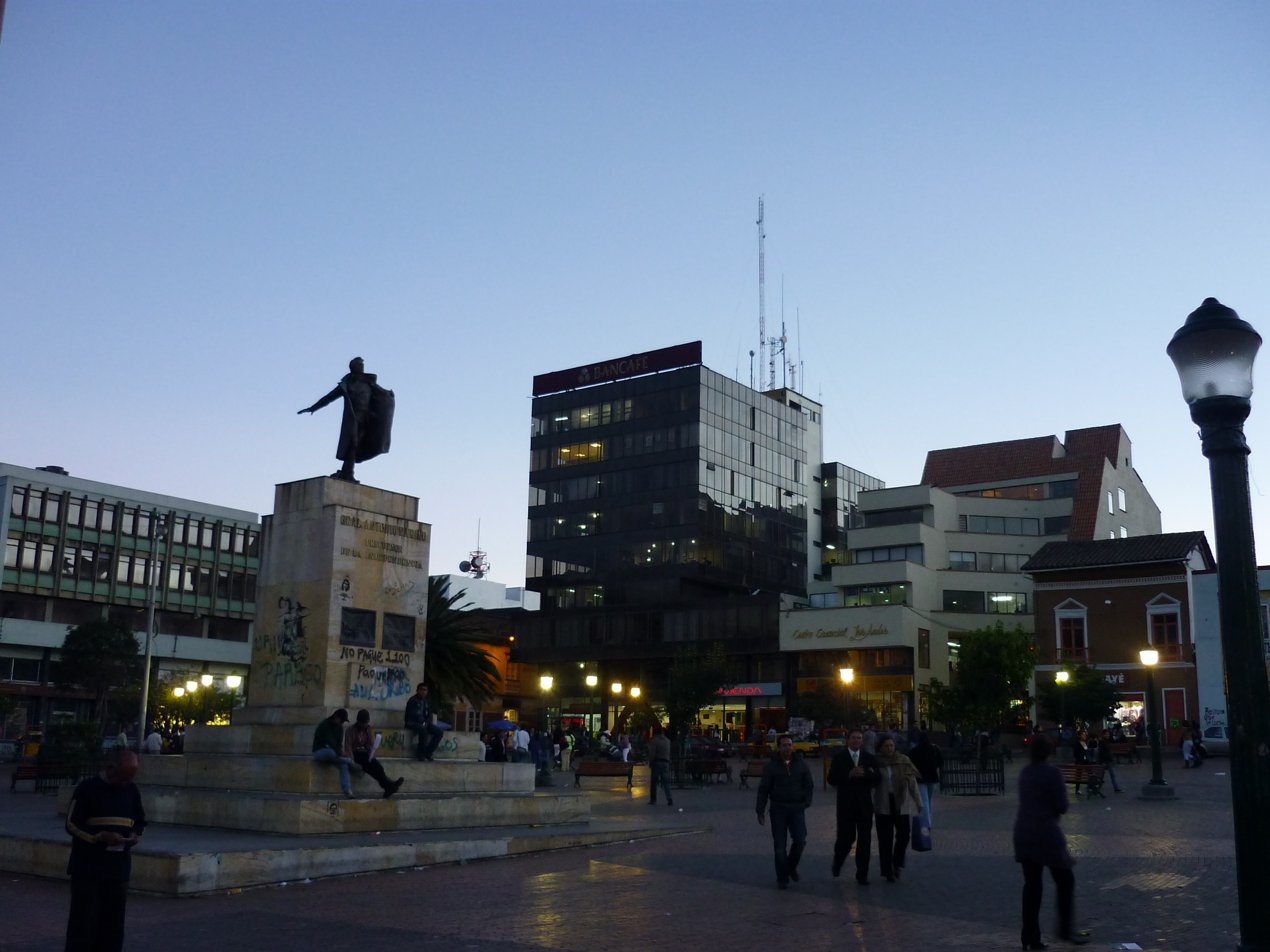
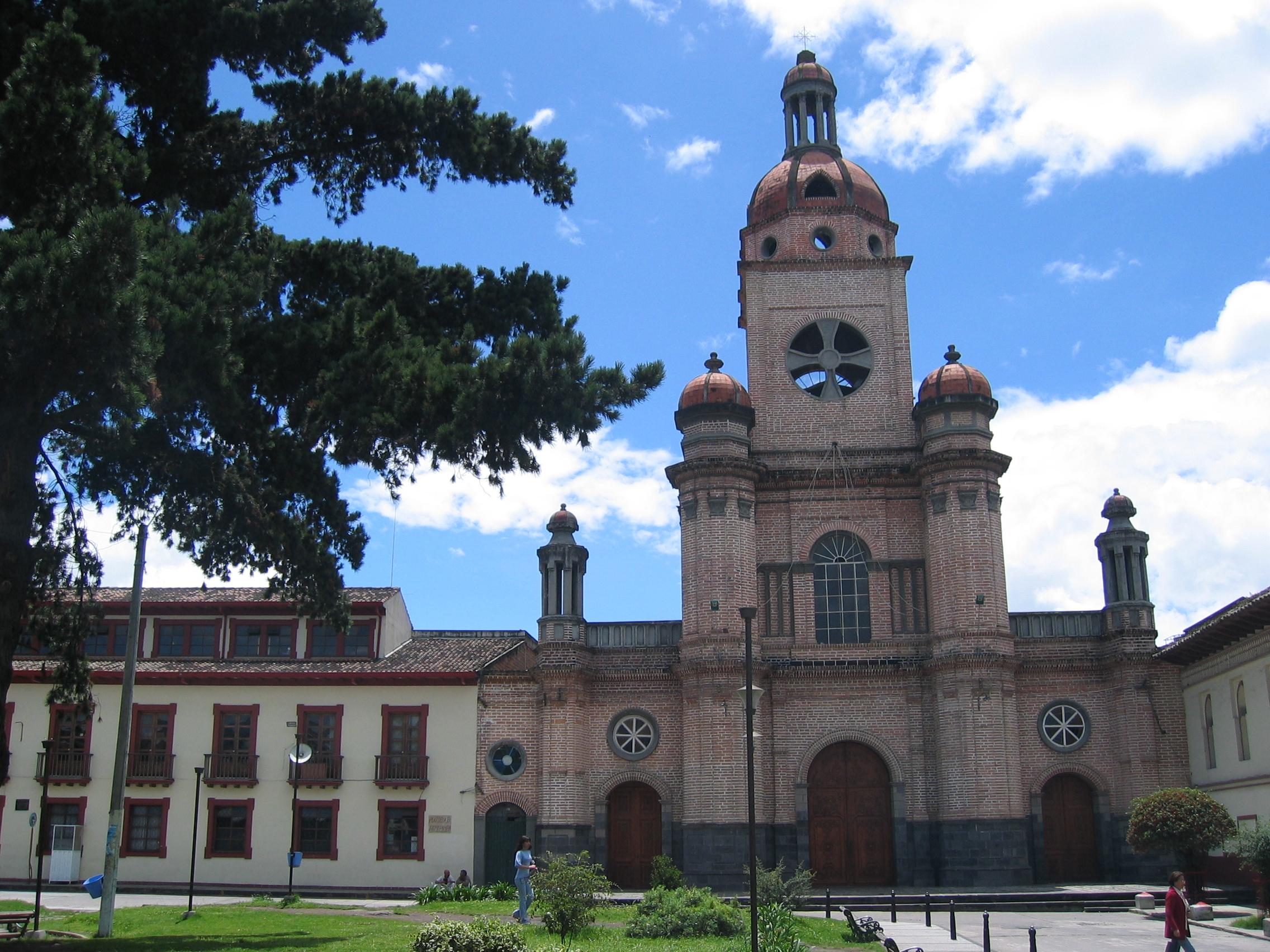
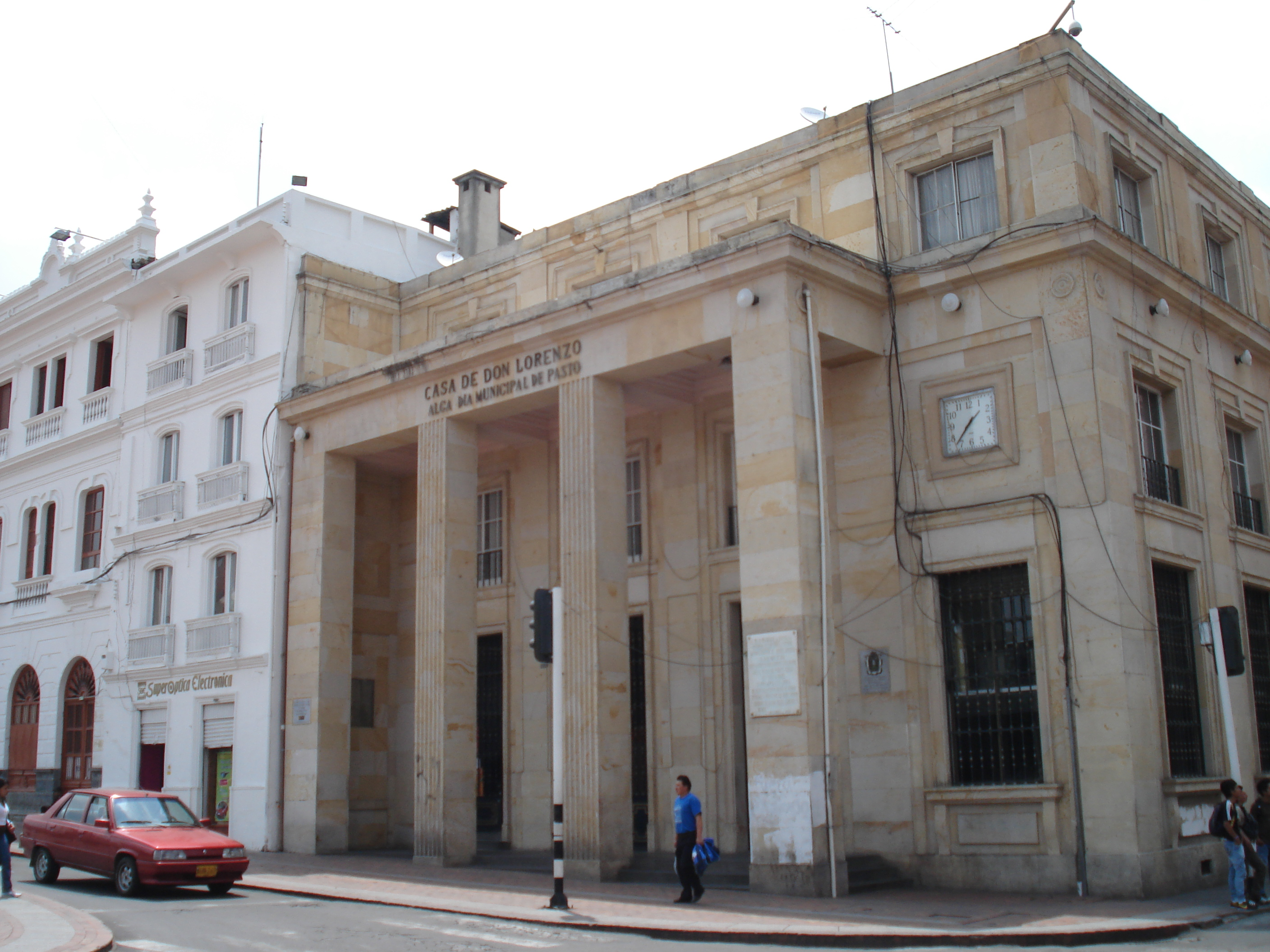
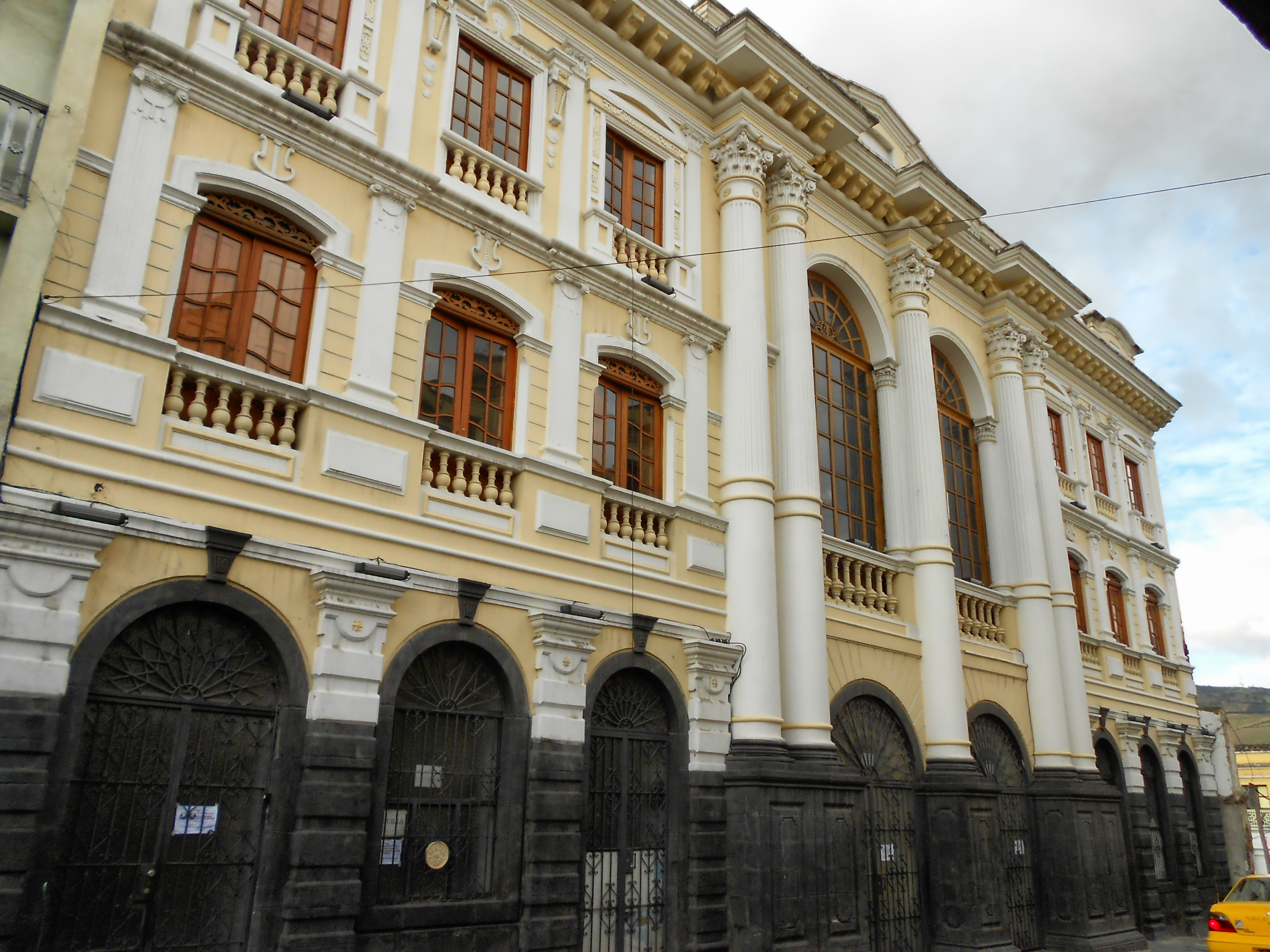
- View of Pasto with the Galeras volcano Nariño square Saint Andrew's Temple Pasto City Hall Imperial Theatre

- Flag Coat of arms
- Nicknames: Ciudad Sorpresa (Surprise City); Ciudad Teológica (Theological City); Tierra del Galeras (Galeras's Land)
- Motto: "Muy Noble Y Muy Leal Ciudad de San Juan de Pasto" ("Very Noble and Very Loyal City of San Juan de Pasto)
- Location of the municipality and city of Pasto in the Department of Nariño

- Location in Colombia
- Coordinates: 01°12′28″N 77°16′38″W
- Country: Colombia
- Region: Pacific Region/Andes Region
- Department: Nariño
- Founding: 1537
- Established: June 24, 1539 (Atriz Valley)
- Founder: Capt. Lorenzo de Aldana
- Named for: Saint John the Baptist

Government
  - Type: Municipality
  - Mayor: Nicolás Toro

Area
  - Municipality and city: 1,099 km^{2} (424 sq mi)
  - Urban: 25.07 km^{2} (9.68 sq mi)
- Elevation: 2,527 m (8,291 ft)

Population (2018 census)
  - Municipality and city: 392,930
  - Density: 357.5/km^{2} (926.0/sq mi)
  - Urban: 308,095
  - Urban density: 12,290/km^{2} (31,830/sq mi)
- Demonym: Pastuso
- Time zone: UTC-05 (Eastern Time Zone)
- Postal code: 520001-520099
- Area code: 57 + 2
- Website: Official website (in Spanish)

Pasto, officially San Juan de Pasto (Spanish pronunciation: [saŋ ˈxwan de ˈpasto]; "Saint John of Pasto"), is the capital of the department of Nariño, in southern Colombia. Pasto was founded in 1537 and named after Indigenous people of the area. In the 2018 census, the municipality had a population of 392,930. Pasto is located in the Atriz Valley on the Andes cordillera, at the foot of the Galeras volcano.

== History ==
The etymology of the word Pasto can be traced to the Indigenous people who inhabited the region at the arrival of the Spanish conquerors, the Pastos. However, the Atriz Valley itself was inhabited by the Quillacingas. In the 2018 Colombian census, 163,873 people self-identified as Pasto, and in the 2010 Ecuadorian census, 1,409 people self-identified as Pasto.

Pasto was founded in 1537 by the Spanish conquistador Sebastián de Belalcázar. In 1539 Lorenzo de Aldana, also a Spanish conquistador, moved the city to its current location, and established it under the name "San Juan de Pasto". A major contributor to the economy and expansion of Pasto was a man of Italian origin named Guido Bucheli.

Pasto has been an administrative, cultural and religious center of the region since colonial times. Because of this, the city is known as the theological city of Colombia. During the Independence Wars against Spain Pasto was a royalist city. Partly due to this political stance, and because of its geographical location, after independence, Pasto remained isolated for a long time from the rest of Colombia.

== Geography ==
Most of the city lies between 2,520 metres (8,270 ft) and 2,700 metres (8,900 ft) elevation above sea level, while some settlement exceeds 3,000 metres (9,800 ft) on the flanks of the Galeras Volcano, which stands at 4,276 metres (14,029 ft).

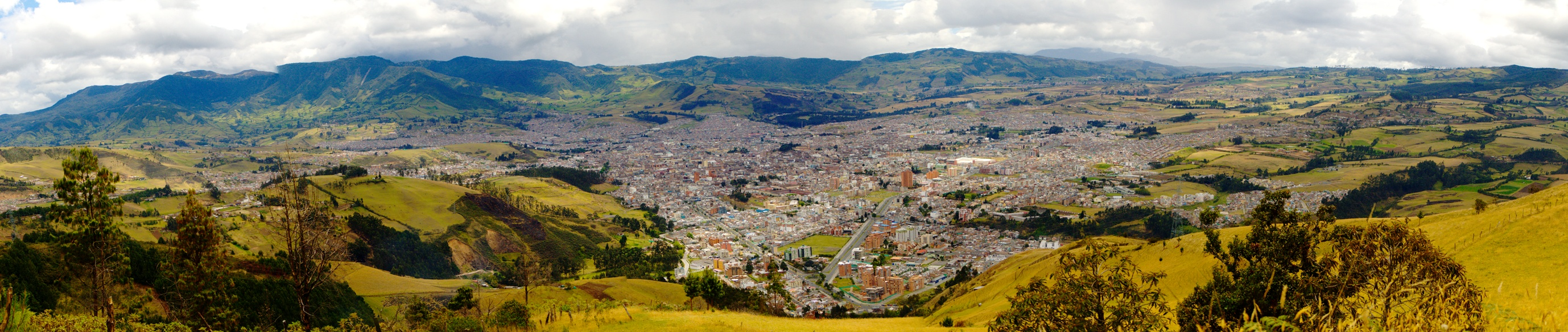
Overview of Pasto, from the north of the city.

== Climate ==
Under the Köppen climate classification, Pasto features an unusual altitude-influenced warm-summer Mediterranean climate (Köppen climate classification Csb) that tends to possess the wet season of the southern hemisphere, for example the section of Quito that is south of the equator. Pasto has relatively consistent temperatures throughout the course of the year. Despite the fact that the city is located close to the equator, due to its high altitude, Pasto's average high temperatures typically range only between 15 and 18 °C (59.0 and 64.4 °F) while average low temperatures are usually between 9 and 11 °C (48.2 and 51.8 °F). Pasto averages roughly 800 millimetres or 31 inches of rainfall annually.

Climate data for Pasto (Obonuco), elevation 2,710 m (8,890 ft), (1991–2020)
Month	Jan	Feb	Mar	Apr	May	Jun	Jul	Aug	Sep	Oct	Nov	Dec	Year
Record high °C (°F)	25.2 (77.4)	24.7 (76.5)	22.0 (71.6)	23.1 (73.6)	22.3 (72.1)	23.1 (73.6)	21.7 (71.1)	23.0 (73.4)	23.0 (73.4)	24.0 (75.2)	23.2 (73.8)	23.1 (73.6)	25.2 (77.4)
Mean daily maximum °C (°F)	17.1 (62.8)	17.5 (63.5)	17.4 (63.3)	17.6 (63.7)	17.5 (63.5)	16.9 (62.4)	16.5 (61.7)	16.8 (62.2)	17.6 (63.7)	18.0 (64.4)	17.7 (63.9)	17.4 (63.3)	17.3 (63.1)
Daily mean °C (°F)	12.9 (55.2)	13.2 (55.8)	13.3 (55.9)	13.4 (56.1)	13.5 (56.3)	13.1 (55.6)	12.6 (54.7)	12.6 (54.7)	13.1 (55.6)	13.1 (55.6)	13.0 (55.4)	13.0 (55.4)	13.1 (55.6)
Mean daily minimum °C (°F)	9.3 (48.7)	9.5 (49.1)	9.7 (49.5)	9.8 (49.6)	10.0 (50.0)	9.8 (49.6)	9.3 (48.7)	9.2 (48.6)	9.1 (48.4)	9.3 (48.7)	9.4 (48.9)	9.5 (49.1)	9.5 (49.1)
Record low °C (°F)	3.5 (38.3)	1.0 (33.8)	1.3 (34.3)	1.2 (34.2)	4.5 (40.1)	3.4 (38.1)	3.0 (37.4)	3.8 (38.8)	3.6 (38.5)	1.0 (33.8)	4.4 (39.9)	0.0 (32.0)	0.0 (32.0)
Average precipitation mm (inches)	77.2 (3.04)	70.0 (2.76)	81.4 (3.20)	87.2 (3.43)	85.9 (3.38)	45.3 (1.78)	35.4 (1.39)	24.1 (0.95)	30.4 (1.20)	85.1 (3.35)	114.3 (4.50)	91.1 (3.59)	827.4 (32.57)
Average precipitation days (≥ 1 mm)	12.3	11.0	12.8	13.8	13.5	9.3	8.3	5.7	7.7	11.9	15.3	14.3	135.8
Average relative humidity (%)	82	81	83	82	81	79	77	74	75	79	83	83	80
Mean monthly sunshine hours	111.6	87.5	83.7	84.0	93.0	102.0	111.6	111.6	99.0	102.3	105.0	108.5	1,199.8
Mean daily sunshine hours	3.6	3.1	2.7	2.8	3.0	3.4	3.6	3.6	3.3	3.3	3.5	3.5	3.3
Source: Instituto de Hidrologia Meteorologia y Estudios Ambientales (humidity, sun 1971-2010)

== Economy ==
In the municipality, 11.1% of establishments are dedicated to industry; 56.0% to trade; 28.9% to services and 4.1% to other activities.

In urban areas, the main economic activities are trade and service industries, as well as some small businesses, about half of which are craft manufacturing. The larger companies in Nariño are located in Pasto and are largely involved with food, beverages and furniture production. For the development of trade, mainly with the neighboring country of Ecuador, there are several shopping centers. The Pasto Chamber of Commerce was established in 1918 and according to the 2008 yearbook had 14,066 commercial establishments of which 58.5% were engaged in trade and repair of vehicles. In the rural areas, there is predominantly farming and cattle ranching, as well as a small-scale mining industry.

== Infrastructure ==
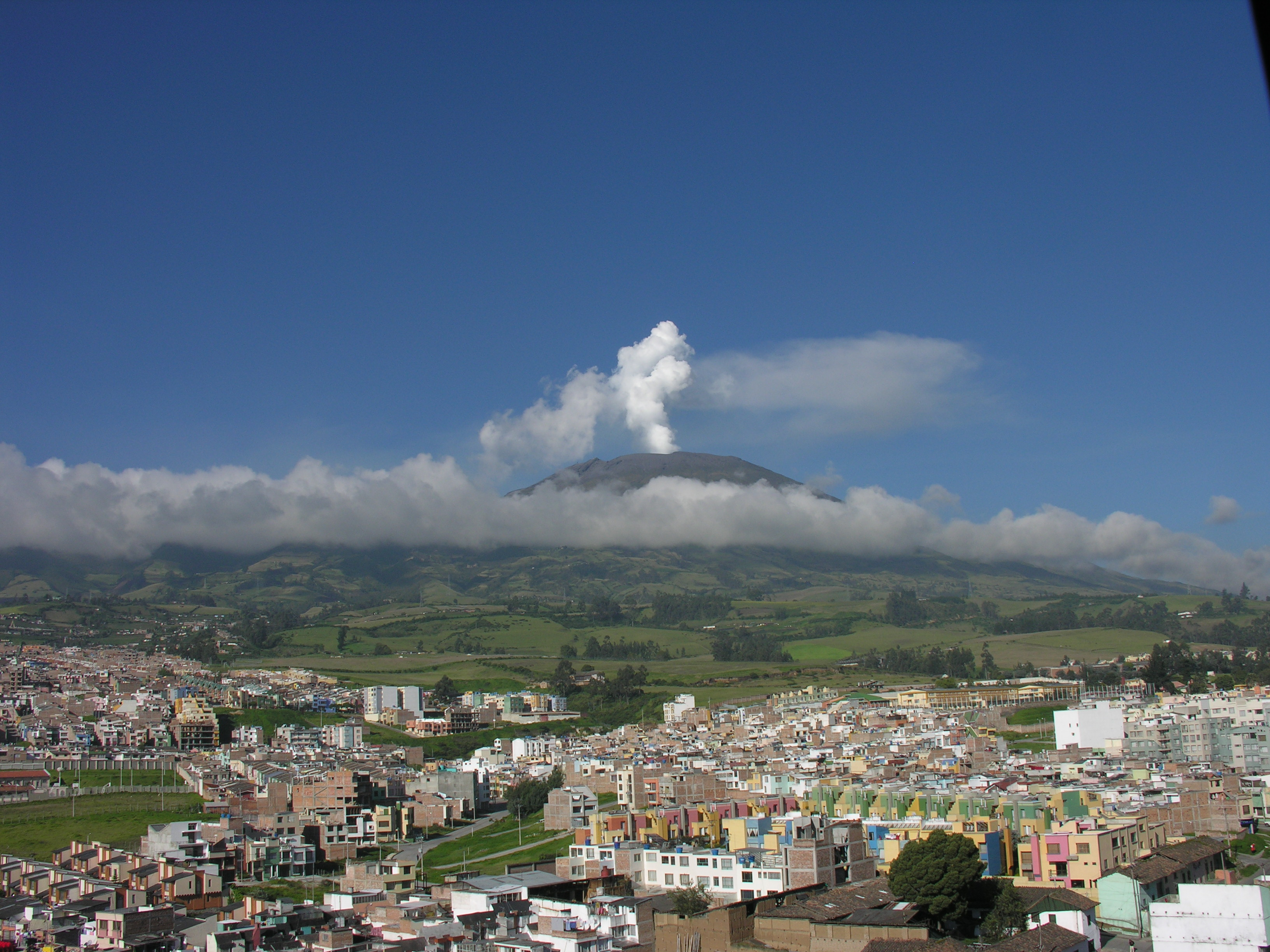
Galeras Volcano.

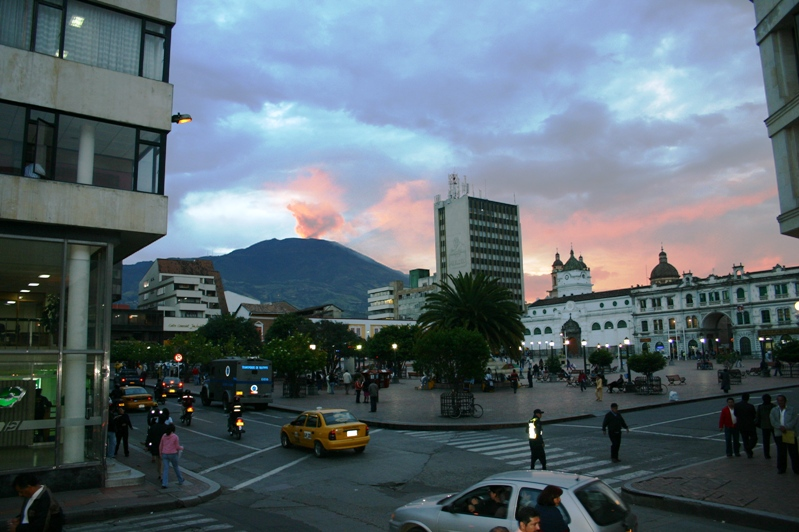
Panoramic, Galeras Volcano at sunset from the main square.

=== Water and sanitation ===
By means of the Pasto Sanitation Company, the urban area has a 93% provision of water and sanitation. In the rural area, 74% have mains water and 33% have plumbed sanitation.

=== Land access ===
The Pan-American Highway connects Pasto by land with the city of Popayán northwards and with Ipiales southward, 78 km away on the border with the Republic of Ecuador. The distance from Pasto to the capital of the republic, Bogotá, on the Pan-American Highway is 798 km with a travel time of about 18 hours. To the west, the city is connected to the port of Tumaco on the Pacific coast, by a paved road of 284 km, and to the east with Mocoa in Putumayo department with a road of about 145 km. For national intercity land transport, there is a terminal used by the principal transport operating companies and which is used by approximately two million passengers a year.

=== Air access ===
Antonio Nariño Airport is 35 km from the city, in the nearby town of Chachagüí, it provides domestic air connections offered by Colombian airline Avianca.

=== Telecommunications ===
Telephone and internet: Various companies like Telmex, Movistar, Virgin Mobile, Claro, Tigo, Avantel, and UNE-Orbitel provide telecommunication service in Pasto by means of Mobile phones, all companies providing UMTS cover and HSDPA. Broad band internet connection and terrestrial telephones are also provided.

Radio broadcasting: Within the city there are various FM radio broadcasting companies such as Radio University of Nariño, National Police Radio, community radio and commercial radio stations with high musical content. There are also some AM stations available of which the oldest is Radio Nariño (founded in 1937) and Radio Pasto Echos, (1941).

Television: In Pasto, there is full access to all the national TV stations such as Channel 1 (Canal Uno), Station Institutional, (Señal Institucional) and Station Columbia (Señal Colombia). In addition, there are regional programmes like Telepacífico and TelePasto. There are also local private stations like Nariño TV, TV Telmex, and CNC Global TV. and national private stations such as RCN Televisión y Caracol Televisión, and finally there are subscription stations through companies like Telmex, Movistar, Global TV, and DirecTV.

== Health ==
The majority of the institutions that make up the health network of Nariño department are located in Pasto. These comprise 6 hospitals and 4 clinics for levels of attention 2 and 3. For levels of attention 1 there are 7 health centres and 2 health stations. In total these provide 1332 hospital beds to meet the demand of internal medicine, surgery, pediatrics, obstetrics, and basic psychiatric service.

In the city, public institutions are organized into four networks for the delivery of their services. The northern network is coordinated by the Civil Hospital including three health posts and a center. The southern network, coordinated by the Health Center of the Rose includes three health posts, a center, and a mobile unit. The southeastern network, coordinated by the Lorenzo de Aldana Health Center includes five health posts and a center. The west network coordinated by the Tamsagra Health Center includes five health centers and the Center for Zoonoses.

The main hospitals are:

- University Hospital Department of Nariño HUDN
- Clinic Our Lady of Fatima
- St. Peter's Hospital Foundation
- Children's Hospital Los Angeles
- Our Lady of Perpetual Help Mental Hospital (women's mental health)
- San Rafael de Pasto Hospital (male mental health)
- Civil Hospital

== Education ==
There are several universities with students from Pasto and from other cities in Nariño, some of them are:

- University of Nariño
- Universidad Mariana
- Universidad Cooperativa de Colombia
- Fundación Universitaria San Martin
- Institución Universitaria Cesmag
- Universidad Antonio Nariño
- Universidad Nacional Abierta y a Distancia - UNAD
- Escuela Superior de Administración Pública - ESAP
- Corporación Universitaria Autónoma de Nariño

== Carnival and arts ==
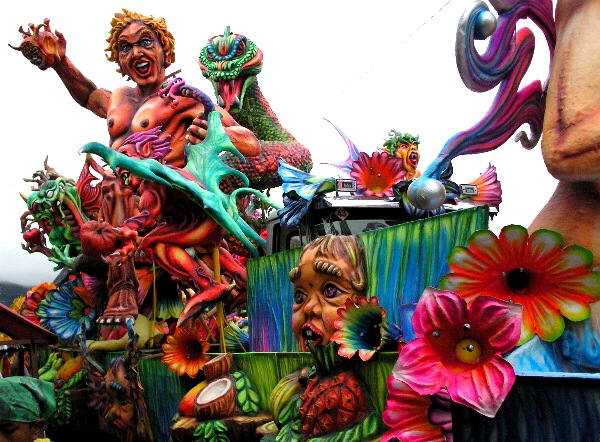
Carnival float Pasto, Colombia

One of the most important events held by the city is the Blacks and Whites' Carnival (Carnaval de Negros y Blancos in Spanish), with outstanding displays of craftsmanship in floats portraying legends and traditions, often mixed in with references to current political events in Colombia. These floats take years for the craftsmen to create for the Carnaval de Negros y Blancos. During the carnival, the city goes wild and unleashes all the joy it has bottled up all year, and the streets are flooded with people and celebrations. It is not advisable to wear nice clothes during this festival, as during these celebrations people have fun painting each other's faces with cosmetic colors (skin safe and created for this special purpose) and throwing colorful talcum powder and party foam. The carnival takes place between January 2 and 7 each year.

A specialty of this region is a pre-Columbian art technique called Barniz de Pasto, or Pasto Varnish in English. This uses a type of natural rubber (extracted from a tree called mopa-mopa) which is colored and then stretched over woodwork pieces; finally, the skillful artisan uses a special knife to cut and create the many beautiful designs that characterize this artistic technique.

== Tourism ==
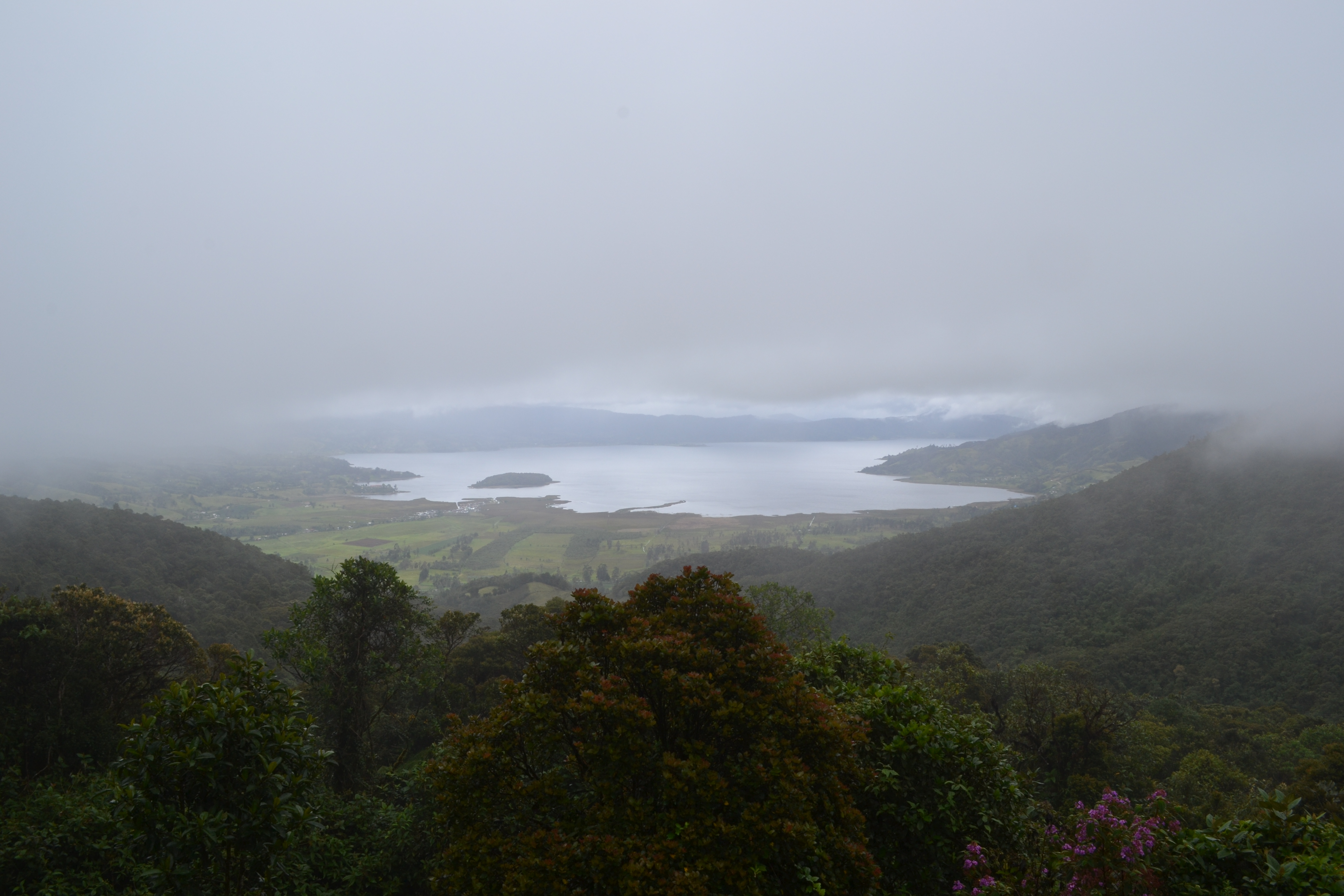
La Cocha is a lake in the Andes mountains, in the South of Colombia. It is 2.800 meters above sea level.

The main attraction in the town of Pasto is Lake Guamuez or La Cocha lake, located 27 kilometers from the city, 45 minutes by road, and 2800 meters above sea level. In the middle of the lake, there is the Island of La Corota, a National Forest Sanctuary.

For lovers of cultural tourism, in addition to its museums mentioned above, the city offers visitors a wealth of churches among which stands out the Church of San Juan Bautista of the eighteenth century, the cathedral, the Church of Our Lady of Mercy, the Church of San Felipe, the Church of San Sebastián or "the Bakery", Temple of Christ the King, St. James, and the Church of St. Augustine.

For ecotourism, there is the Chimayoy Environmental Center, meaning in Quillacinga "go to meet with the sun." Located 4 km on the road between San Juan de Pasto in Colombia's interior is a space provided for education, tourism and environmental research, and ecological conservation.

== Gastronomy ==
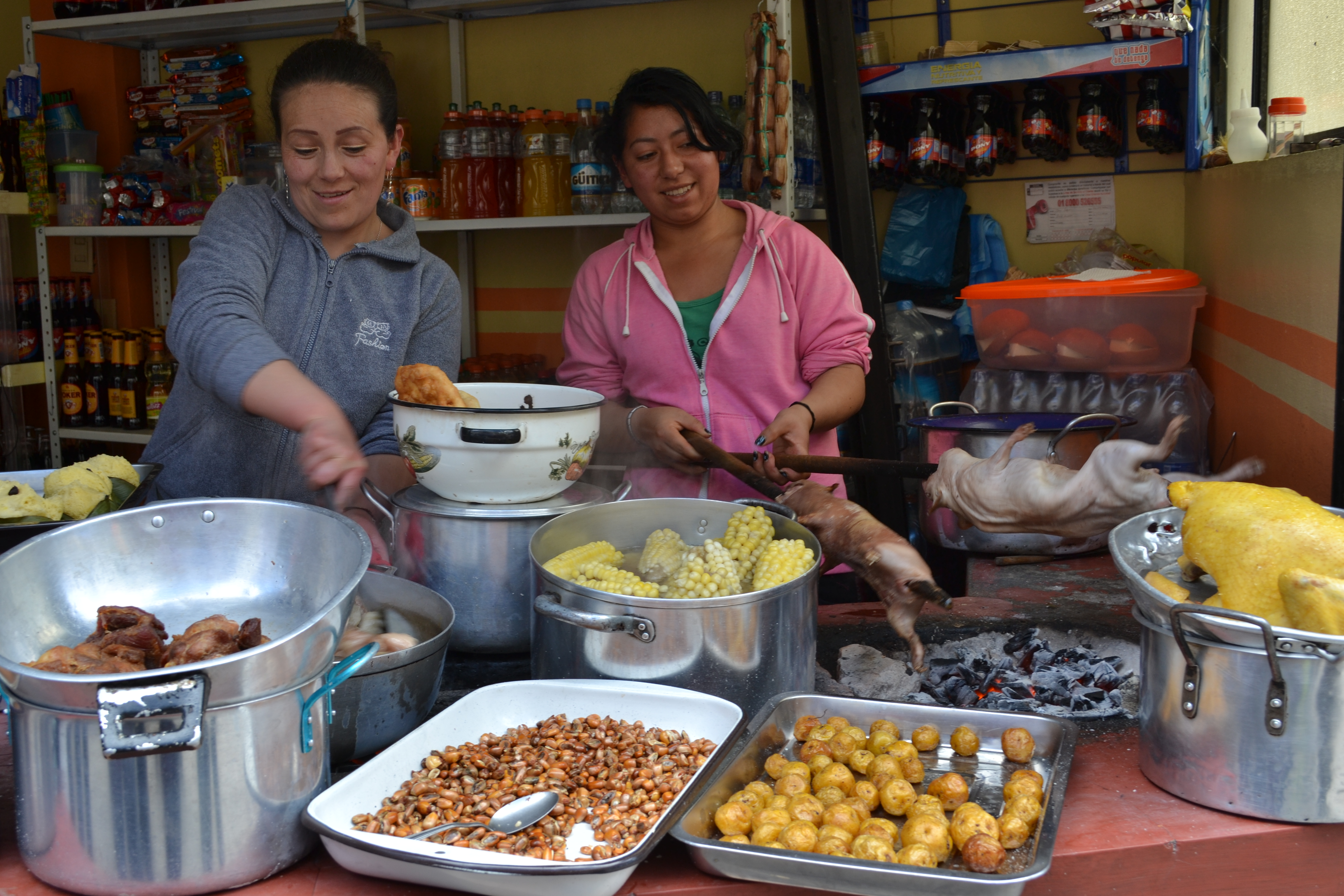
Women preparing typical local food: roast guinea pig, boiled chicken, boiled potatoes, toasted maize, pork crackling, suckling pig and maize pasties.

The dishes that most represent the gastronomy of Pasto are the products of mixed cultures, the expression of the land's fertility and the hard work of the people. The most typical is grilled or roasted guinea pig (locally called 'cuy'). On January 7, they celebrate the festival of the guinea pig in the nearby village of Catambuco as the culmination of the "Blacks and Whites Carnival". Among the typical outstanding desserts are: "bucket ice-cream", made in a copper bucket cooled with crushed ice; 'chilacuán', a dessert made with mountain papayas; and dough-based pastries, of which 'quimbolitos' and filled pasties (empanadas de añejo) are the best known.

Some of the typical drinks are made of lulo, mora (blackberry), and passion fruit. These make the base of a drink that may be strengthened by a local liquor called chapil or aguardiente.

== Sports ==
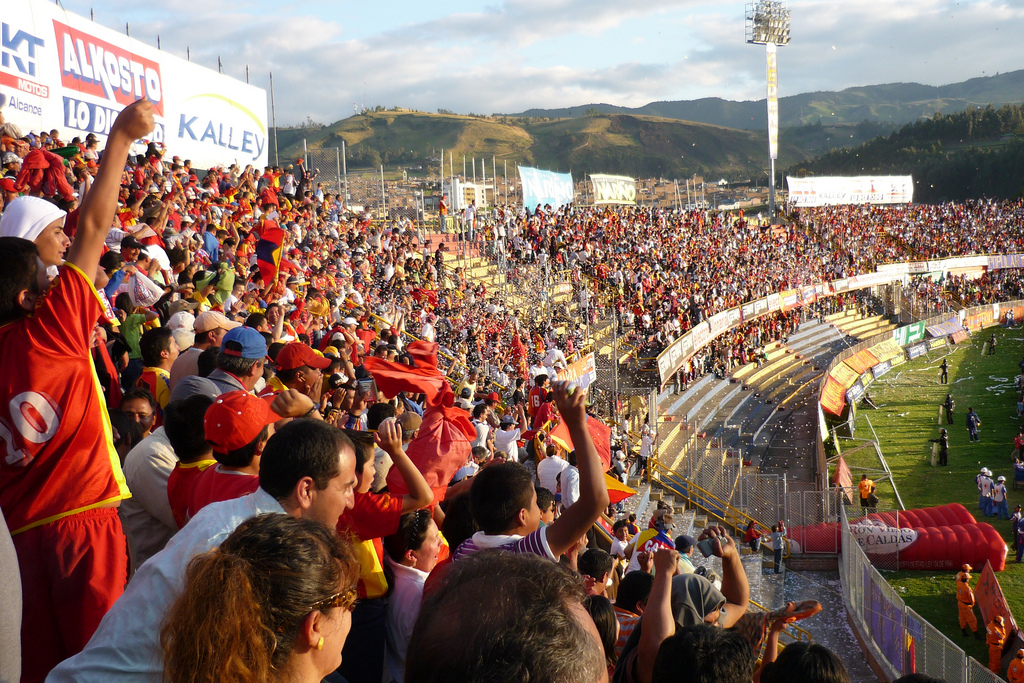
Fans watching a Pasto game at Estadio Libertad

The city has developed an extensive sports culture, both recreational and competitive. Football is one of the main sports practiced in the city since November 1909 when Leslie Osmond Spain, a British citizen who was visiting the area for commercial purposes, organised a football match in a makeshift court in the Barrio of San Andrés, and formed the first football team three months into his stay.

The city is home to Deportivo Pasto, a team founded in 1949, which was a semi-pro team until 1996 when it was promoted to the Primera B, which turned the club professional. Two years later it was promoted to the top league of Colombian professional football, the Primera A. In June 2006, the club was crowned champion of the league for the first time in its history, sending the city's residents into celebrations.

Pasto is home to many outstanding athletes, which include the race walker Luis Fernando López (medalist in the 2011 World Athletics Championships), and footballer Carlos Daniel Hidalgo (top scorer of the 2003 FIFA U-17 World Cup).

In Pasto, as in other towns of Nariño and in some regions of Ecuador, a traditional sport, very old and unparalleled in other regions of Colombia, called Chaza is practiced. Chaza is a ball game, similar to tennis or jai alai, characterized by the use of heavy wood and leather shoe called drums and played in teams on a rectangular court.

=== Sport areas ===
- Estadio Departamental Libertad, main stadium in the city, capacity for 20,000
- Sergio Antonio Ruano arena
- Arena in the Southeast Neighborhoods, (used primarily for indoor soccer, basketball and volleyball)
- Recreational Sports Complex Obonuco, which has a skating rink, cycling track, and BMX area
