= Yla =

Yla may refer to:

== Places ==
- Ylä-Enonvesi, Finland
- Ylä-Malmi, Finland
- Ylä-Rieveli, Finland

== Other ==
- YLA, part of Model Congress
- Yaul language (by ISO 639 code)
- YLA (group), an American girl group
