= Enonkoski =

- Municipality
- Enonkosken kunta Enonkoski kommun
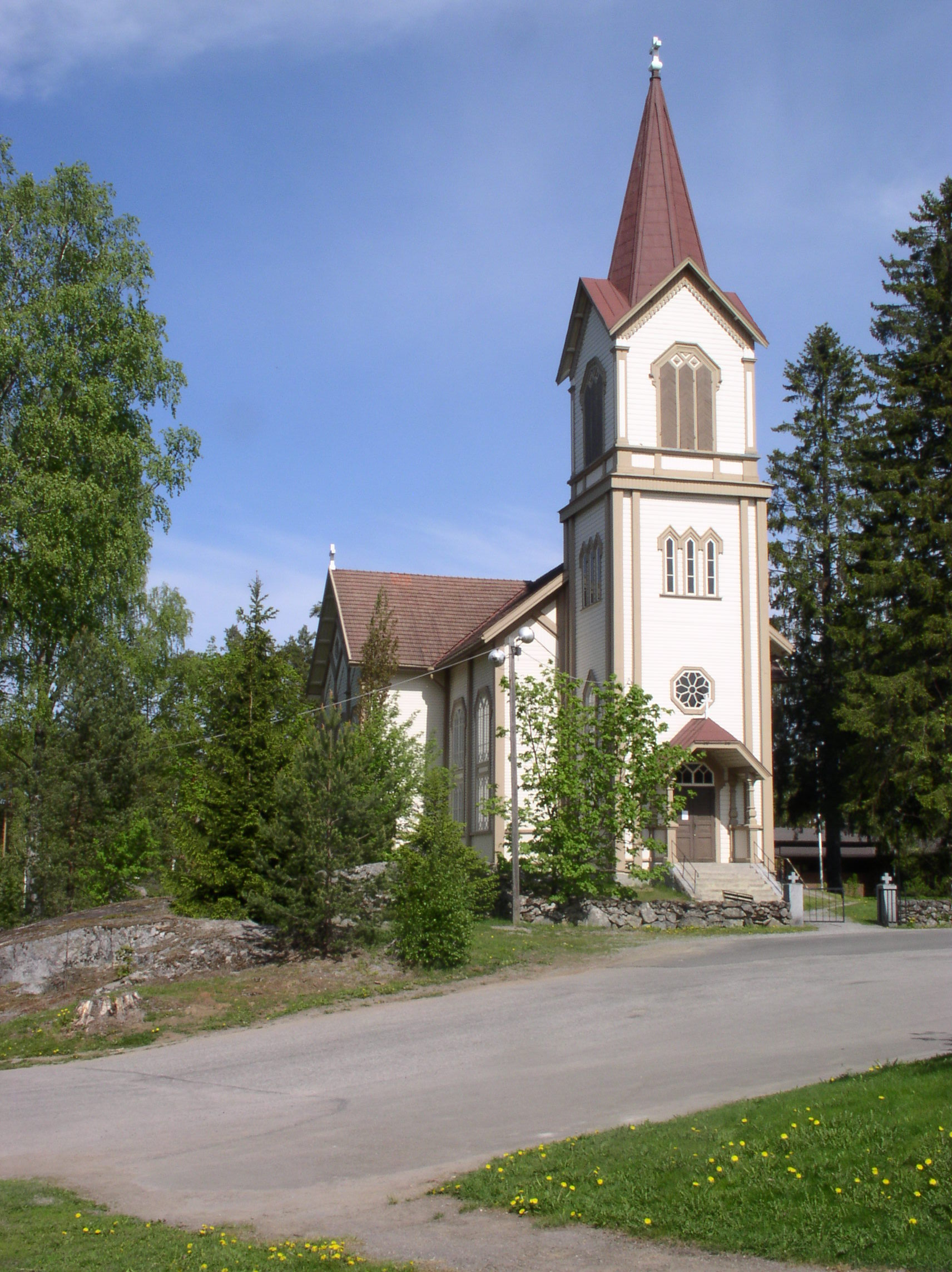
- Enonkoski Church (Magnus Schjerfbeck, 1886)

- Coat of arms

- Location of Enonkoski in Finland
- Interactive map of Enonkoski
- Coordinates: 62°05.5′N 028°56′E
- Country: Finland
- Region: South Savo
- Sub-region: Savonlinna
- Charter: 1882

Government
  - Municipal manager: Kari Kuuramaa

Area (2018-01-01)
  - Total: 419.20 km^{2} (161.85 sq mi)
  - Land: 305.58 km^{2} (117.99 sq mi)
  - Water: 113.37 km^{2} (43.77 sq mi)
  - Rank: 232nd largest in Finland

Population (2025-12-31)
  - Total: 1,273
  - Rank: 282nd largest in Finland
  - Density: 4.17/km^{2} (10.8/sq mi)

Population by native language
  - Finnish: 96.3% (official)
  - Others: 3.7%

Population by age
  - 0 to 14: 11.5%
  - 15 to 64: 50%
  - 65 or older: 38.5%
- Time zone: UTC+02:00 (EET)
  - Summer (DST): UTC+03:00 (EEST)
- Website: enonkoski.fi

Enonkoski (Finnish pronunciation: [ˈenoŋˌkoski]) is a municipality of Finland. It is encircled by the city of Savonlinna in the South Savo region. It is the smallest municipality in South Savo in terms of population.

== History ==
Enonkoski was founded in 1882. Before that it was part of Kerimäki and Heinävesi. The major reason for the foundation of independent parish of Enonkoski happened in 1858. Enonkoski did not have its own church, and on Sundays people had to row to the church to Kerimäki, a parish Enonkoski was part of that time. In 1858 there was a church boat accident in the lake Ylä-Enonvesi, which led to the death of eight people. After that, a Russian businessman and a leader of an Enonkoski glass factory and a sawmill decided to build a church in Enonkoski. He is alleged to have said: "the people in Enonkoski do not anymore have to drown on their trips to the church". The wooden church was built in the next year but it was destroyed in a fire caused by lightning in 1884. A new church made of wood, which is still in use, was built in 1886.

== Languages ==
The municipality is unilingually Finnish.

There also is a Russian speaking minority.

== Religion ==
The majority of the people living in Enonkoski are Evangelical Lutheran. There is a church in the centre of Enonkoski, built in 1886. The only Evangelical Lutheran monastery in Finland, the Monastic Protestant Community in Enonkoski, is located in Enonkoski.

== Transport ==
Enonkoski has one main road which leads to Savonlinna, 33 kilometres (21 mi) away. It also has other roads which lead to the small dock neighborhood called Hyypiänniemi and to another area known as Hanhivirta.

== Amenities ==
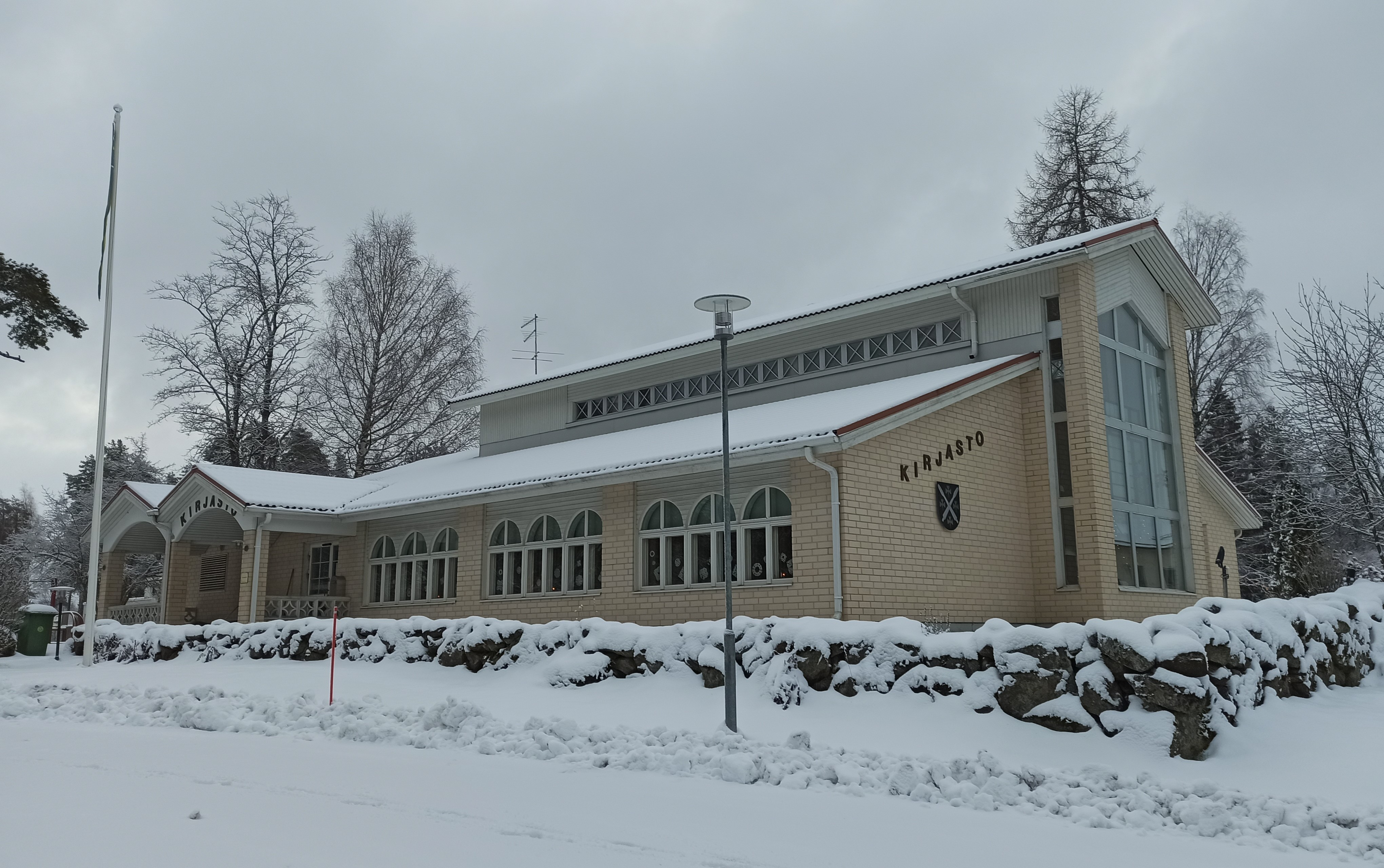
Enonkoski Library

Enonkoski is a very small town, with two small supermarkets, a gas station, a gift shop, several bakeries and cafés and a bar. It also has a retirement home called Iltasatu, which translates to bedtime story.

Towards the edge of the town, near a fire station, there is a running track with a well-kept field (usually used for association football) in the middle. In addition, there is a school which has an ice skating rink, used in the winter, and an indoor sports arena. Adjacent to the school is a library built in 1992. Enonkoski houses a rehab facility.

== Industry ==
The largest business in the town is a fish research plant where they raise fish in a controlled environment and then release them into the lakes which are abundant in the area.

== Sport ==
Enonkoski has a juniors and senior volleyball team Enonkosken Pyrintö playing in the second highest tier of men's volleyball in Finland. Football club Karvilan Kivekkäät has a couple of youth teams and a women's team that won the regional championship in 2009. There is also a cross country track used for cross-country skiing in winter and jogging in summer. Participation in the yearly skiing competitions is very high. Orienteering is also quite popular sport. The sports club for athletics, skiing and orienteering is called Enonkosken Urheilijat.

== Notable people ==
- Antti Loikkanen (1955) is a Finnish former middle-distance and endurance runner (European indoor champion 1978)

== Villages ==
Hanhijärvi, Ihamaniemi, Joutsenmäki, Karvila, Laasala, Makkola, Muhola, Paakkunala, Parkumäki, Simanala, Suurimäki and Vuorikoski are villages in Enonkoski.

== Border changes ==
In 2009 the neighbouring municipalities of Enonkoski, Savonranta and the city of Savonlinna, unified as a one municipality. According to the law of Finland, the unifying municipalities must have a land connection between them, which Savoninna and Savonranta did not have. Because of that a land strip of 31.24 square kilometres (12.06 sq mi) was taken off from the area of Enonkoski municipality to connect the parts together. After Kerimäki and Punkaharju were consolidated with the town of Savonlinna on 1 January 2013, Enonkoski became completely surrounded by the emerging city.
