= Finnish Evangelical Lutheran Prayer Brotherhood =

Finnish Evangelical Lutheran Prayer Brotherhood is a sodality of pastors in Evangelical Lutheran Church of Finland, bound together by a common rule of life. The spirituality of the Brotherhood is largely based on meditative prayer of Luther's Small Catechism. The Brotherhood uses Finnish St Thomas Cross as its emblem. Despite its name, it has no common origin with Evangelisch-Lutherische Gebetsbruderschaft.

== History ==
The Brotherhood was founded in 1989. It is led by father confessor. The first father confessor of the Brotherhood was Jouko N. Martikainen, professor in the Oriental Church History at the University of Göttingen. The second Father Confessor since 2006 is Jouko M. V. Heikkinen. The episcopal visitor until 2006 has been Matti Sihvonen, bishop emeritus of Kuopio, and later Seppo Häkkinen, bishop of Mikkeli.

== See also ==
- Monastic Community of Enonkoski
