= Polttoainehankinta =

Finnish 1952 defence plan

- Type: Strategic operations order
- Location: Finland
- Planned: Approved 13 June 1952; Replaced December 1957
- Planned by: Finnish General Headquarters
- Objective: Defence of Finland against an attack from Western Powers

Polttoainehankinta (lit. 'Fuel Procurement') was a secret Finnish Defence Forces operations order approved on 13 June 1952. It is notable as the first Finnish operations order following the end of World War II. It described on a high level the Finnish response to an attack from northern Norway by Western Powers, potentially in conjunction with naval attacks from the Baltic Sea. A Soviet attack was not officially considered a possibility due to the Finno-Soviet Agreement of Friendship, Cooperation and Mutual Assistance of 1948.

The plan divided Finland into four areas of responsibility that were expected to conduct operations independently if they lost contact with the Finnish High Command. Troops from areas of responsibilities not under active combat, together with strategic reserves of the High Command, would be used to counter-attack any enemy forces that threatened to penetrate out of other areas of responsibility.

The plan was criticized for being unrealistic in terms of the tasks expected of the Finnish Air Force, having an overtly complex chain of command, and being too slow to implement in the context of the threat scenarios. In addition, the high level of secrecy prevented key civilian leaders from being contacted before mobilization. Polttoainehankinta was replaced with operations plan Valpuri in December 1957, following the Soviet return of the Porkkala peninsula in 1956.

== Historical background ==
From Finland's independence in 1917 to World War II, the Finnish Defence Forces were organized around the singular task of defeating an attack by the Soviet Union on the Karelian Isthmus. In the case of an attack, the peace-time army would fight a delaying action while the full wartime army was mobilized. After mobilization, the army would continue to delay Soviet forces until international aid could be organized. The only exception to this focus on the Soviet Union was a short-lived 1919–1921 defensive plan aimed at Sweden caused by the Åland Islands dispute. These plans were abandoned following a League of Nations decision that the islands belonged to Finland.

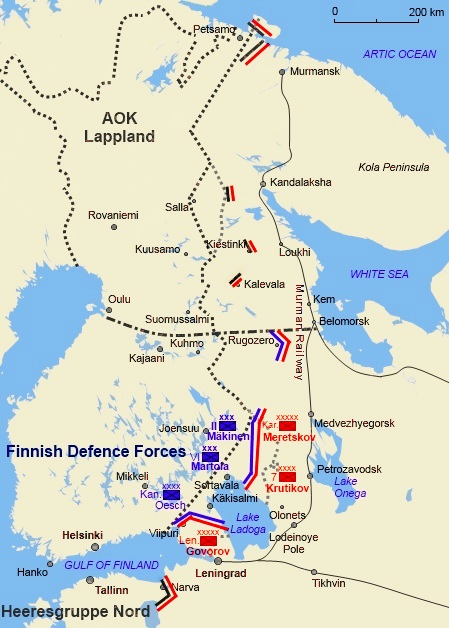
Positions in September 1944. Finnish German Soviet

Finnish participation in World War II is thought of as consisting of three distinct phases of military action. The 1939–1940 Winter War began on 30 November 1939 when the Soviet Union invaded Finland, ending in Moscow Peace Treaty on 13 March 1940. Following several months of peace, Finland launched the Continuation War, the Finnish component of Operation Barbarossa, by attacking the Soviet Union alongside Germany. As part of the Finno-German cooperation, German forces entered Finland in early June, launching Operation Silver Fox from northern Norway and Finnish Lapland on 22 June. Finnish forces crossed the Finno-Soviet border during the night of 9–10 July 1941. Finland sought to exit the war in 1944, following the Soviet Vyborg–Petrozavodsk offensive. Hostilities between Finnish and Soviet forces ended on 19 September 1944, but German operations in northern Finland continued. As part of the Moscow Armistice, Finns were required to expel remaining German forces from Finland. This led to the Finno-German Lapland War, where a demobilizing Finnish Army attacked the German forces remaining in the country. The last German forces left Finnish soil by 27 April 1945. This practically ended hostilities, but no official treaty stating this was ever signed.

Following the end of the Finno-Soviet hostilities, the principally Soviet Allied Control Commission entered Finland. The commission's role was to observe and ensure that Finland abided by the armistice agreement. As such, its members were given complete access to any and all information and locations the commission deemed necessary for their work. Finland also leased Porkkala to the Soviet Union. The Porkkala peninsula, located only 30 kilometres (20 mi) west of the Finnish capital of Helsinki, thus became a Soviet naval base, severely limiting the Finnish ability to defend their capital against a potential Soviet attack. Finland also agreed to demilitarize the Åland islands and reduce the Finnish Defence Forces to a size of 37,000 men.

The subsequent Paris Peace Treaty placed restrictions on Finnish armaments. The treaty banned motor torpedo boats, submarines, bombers, guided missiles and nuclear weapons and limited the number of naval vessels and aircraft allowed. The maximum size of Finnish military forces was modified to 41,900 including border guards. According to Finnish military historians Tynkkynen and Jouko, the most problematic aspect of the treaty was a requirement for Finland to forfeit or destroy all armaments (including e.g. small arms) beyond those needed by the 41,900 sized defence forces: doing so would have effectively preventing a larger Finnish mobilization. However, disagreements between Soviet Union and the United Kingdom on what, exactly, was to be done to the extraneous armaments allowed Finland to simply not act on this latter requirement.

In 1948, Finland signed the Finno-Soviet Agreement of Friendship, Cooperation and Mutual Assistance, also known as the FCMA treaty. The treaty alleviated some of the worst Finnish fears about the intentions of the Soviet leadership and a potential occupation: while it contained a requirement for Finland to resist any outside invasion of Finnish soil by "Germany or its allies", it explicitly forbade the Soviet Union from unilaterally deciding that Soviet military assistance was necessary. Another significant development in vicinity of Finland was the joining of Norway into NATO in 1949.

== Planning and assumptions ==
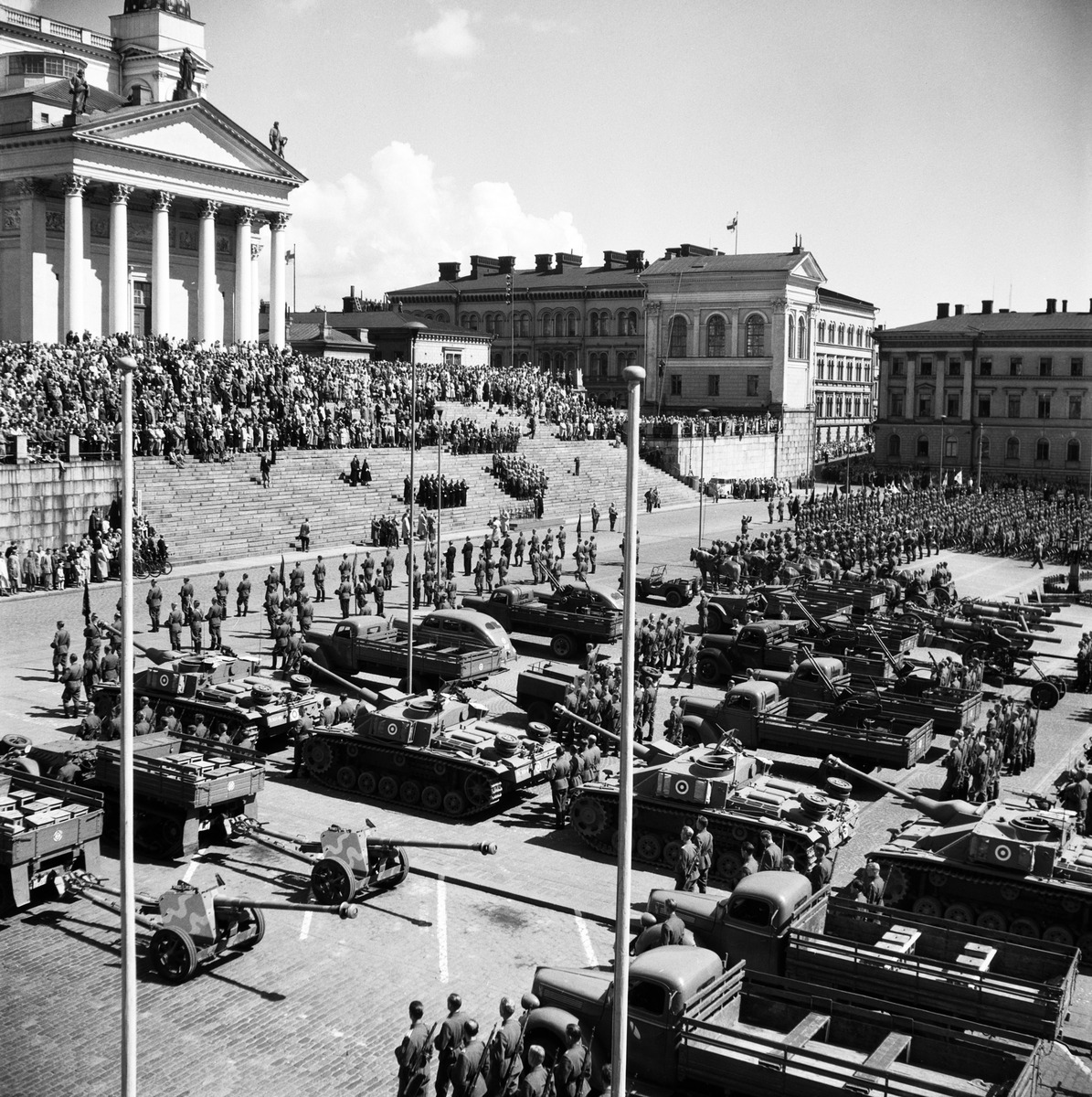
Flag day parade of the Finnish Defence Force, 5 June 1951.

In the immediate aftermath of World War II, in late 1945, Finnish Defence Forces produced rough plans for a potential future mobilization. According to these plans, each military district would first mobilize a battalion-sized formation using cached weapons. These formations would then be expanded to up to a total of 12 brigade-sized formations in a second stage of mobilization. A following third stage of mobilization would then bring the army to its full strength using the post-Winter War procedures. For comparison, the size of the army had been 15 divisions at the end of the Continuation War.

Planning activities were, however, stopped in January 1946 to "avoid accusations of provocation". This ban on planning activities resulted from the Allied Control Commission hearing that the Finns were refreshing their mobilization plans based on the post-Winter War procedures, while the armistice agreement required Finland to adopt the pre-Winter War plans. The Allied Control Commission left Finland in 1947, and the production of military plans resumed soon after on 13 March 1948 with the permission of President J. K. Paasikivi.

The planning of new operations orders began in 1950. The first plans were produced for an "auxiliary complement" (täydennyskokoonpano) of a Finnish Army consisting of 41,900 men, since that was the maximum size of the Finnish Army as approved by the Paris Peace Treaty. In this configuration, the forces would enhance border control, secure important military and civilian targets, and prepare to defend the areas assigned to them. The plans also called for Finnish forces to enter the demilitarized Åland, and the Finnish Navy to lay naval mines.

Planning continued in 1951 based on three threat scenarios or models produced by the Operations Department of the Finnish High Command. Because of the FCMA treaty, these threat models officially viewed the threat on Finland as coming strictly from the west.

Threat Scenario C assumed that the Danish straits remained open, allowing enemy amphibious operations, and that Swedish territory was available to the attacker. As the most dangerous scenario it formed the basis for planning.

Scenario A concerned an attack via northern Norway, with the attacker having no access to Swedish territory. It was also assumed that the Danish Straits would not be open for the attacker, preventing a naval landing. It was assumed that the attacker was seeking to gain access to airports to extend their reach further into the Soviet Union, and to prevent the Soviet Union from using its warm-water ports. Scenario B modified scenario A by assuming the Danish Straits would remain open to the attacker, and that the enemy would also seek to capture Åland and the Hanko Peninsula, thus denying most of the Baltic from the Soviet Navy. Scenario C further extended the previous scenarios by assuming Sweden had joined the invading powers or at least given them access to Swedish areas. In the latter scenarios, the naval invasion in south-western Finland would support a larger attack on the Soviet heartland. Later modifications to the scenarios assumed that, rather than conducting a full naval invasion, the enemy would conduct limited warfare and raids seeking to force Soviet forces to be tied down in Finland.

Irrespective of the exact formulations of the scenarios, the fact that all scenarios included an attack on Northern Finland was a significant change from Finnish pre-World War II defence plans, which treated the northern parts of the country as militarily insignificant. It was assumed that the Northern Finland component of the invasion would consists of at most 6 or 7 divisions, which would attack along two routes. One force would attack along the route Enontekiö – Muonio – Tornio – Kittilä – Rovaniemi, while another force would attack from the direct north along the route Ivalo – Sodankylä – Rovaniemi – Kemijärvi.

Of the three threat scenarios, option C was considered the most dangerous and formed the basis for defence planning. The planning proceeded based on a division of Finland into five areas of responsibility, with each area's commander being responsible for the local planning and preparations. These were quickly reduced to four by merging the Uusimaa Area of Responsibility and the Southwestern Area of Responsibility into a Southern Area of Responsibility. In an event where contact with higher command was lost, the areas would continue operations on their own.

Continued planning in 1951 expanded the plans for two larger configurations of the Finnish Defence Force. The first of these was a "protective forces" (suojajoukot) or "fast deployment forces" configuration of 320,000 men, intended for defence of Finnish borders and the safeguarding of Finnish neutrality. This was followed by a full wartime composition of over 500,000 men.

== Overview ==
Areas of Responsibility as defined in Polttoainehankinta. The Uusimaa and Southwestern Areas of Responsibility were merged early on in during the planning.

Polttoainehankinta was approved on 13 June 1952 as the first complete post-war operations order of the Finnish Army. Sources describe the operations order as both number 8 and number 10. The operations order was kept highly secret and the planning was masked as various training activities. Only 15 copies of the operations order were produced, of which only the three held at the General Headquarters were complete. For example, commanders of military districts were not – at least initially – allowed copies of the order, and instead were limited to reviewing the content in person and only for those parts relevant to their own planning. According to Tynkkynen and Jouko, it would have been normal that of the staff of an infantry brigade, only the commander would have been even aware of the brigade's wartime mission, and that neither the Finnish Ministry of Defence nor even the president of the republic were automatically notified about the plans.

The operations order assumed that fighting could not be contained to border regions in the same way as had been possible in World War II. Thus, all national resources would be required to halt an enemy attack. This was reflected in the division of the country to four areas of responsibility. In doing so, it was the first operations order to embrace the concept of "territorial defence".

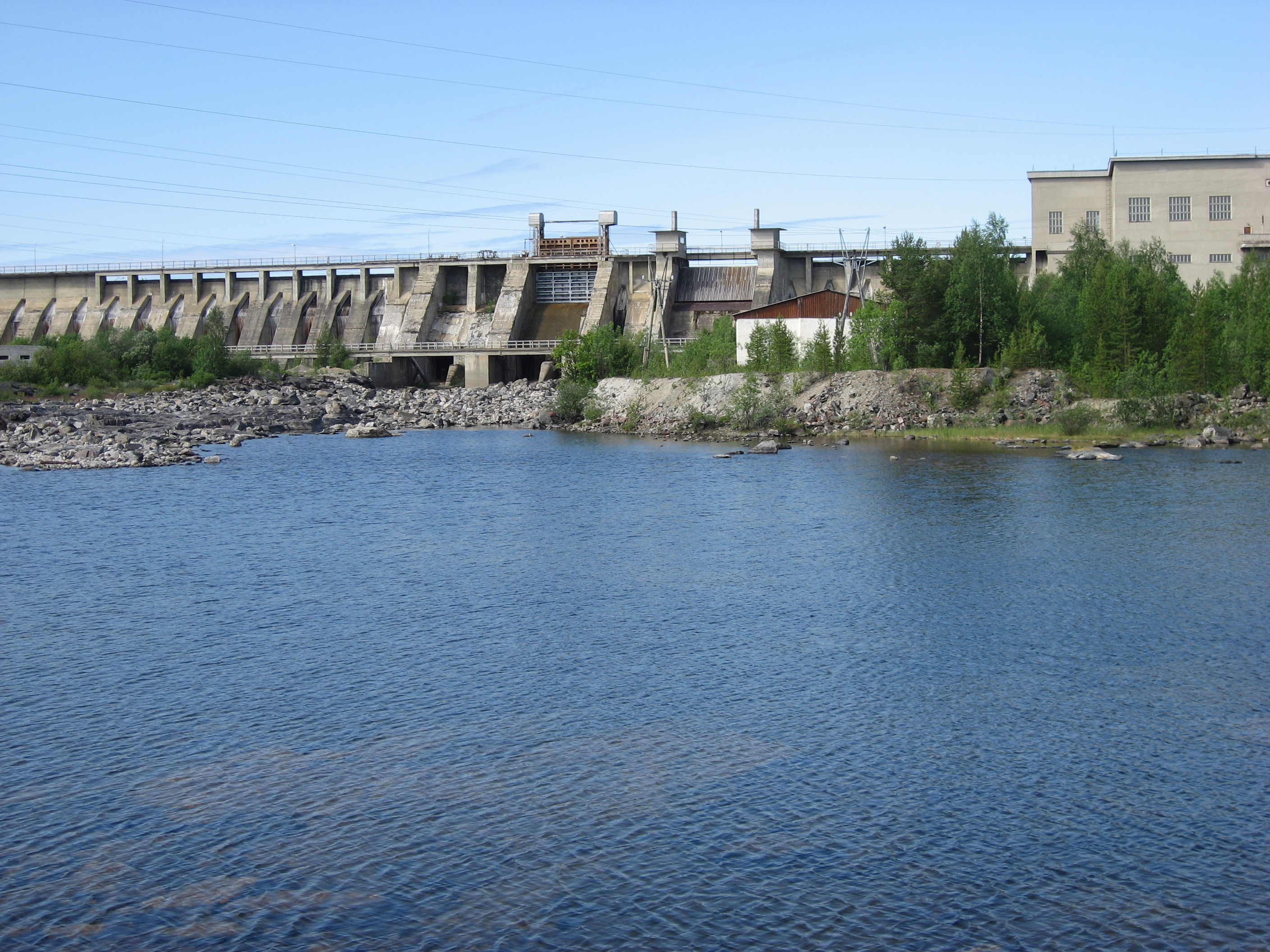
Jäniskoski hydroelectric station in 2009.

The Northern Area of Responsibility would use limited forces in the immediate border regions, with a priority of preventing a penetration to the Jäniskoski hydroelectric station or to the nickel mines in Pechengsky. Most forces would be positioned in southern Lapland, where they would maintain control of the militarily important infrastructure in the region. As a final defensive zone, they were to prevent enemy forces from penetrating southwards to the Inland Area of Responsibility. This southernmost area was to be the location of either counter-attacks by forces held elsewhere, or of persistent guerilla warfare if the first was not feasible.

The Ostrobothnia Area of Responsibility would protect critical infrastructure (including ports), prevent attacks from Sweden over the sea, and block any attacks that penetrated the Northern Area of Responsibility. If not under attack, the forces of the Ostrobothnia Area of Responsibility would be employed as a strategic reserve.

The Southern Area of Responsibility was to focus its efforts on defending the Finnish archipelago and the immediate coastal regions using primarily coastal artillery and a mobile reserve. Any landings were to be repulsed immediately at the coast, using counter-attacks by strategic reserves if necessary. It was also responsible for securing Åland, first with a single brigade and then with a two-brigade corps.

The Inland Area of Responsibility was considered a somewhat safer area, and thus held important defence industry such as ammunition plants and supply depots, as well as units that were to be used as the strategic reserve for counter-attacks. It was tasked with repulsing any airborne invasions in its area, and reacting to any enemy actions that threatened to penetrate out of the other areas of responsibility. As a more focused task, it was also to ensure the land connection to the Soviet base in Porkkala.

In total, the forces available to the various areas of responsibility at the different stages of mobilization were as follows:

Forces available for areas of responsibility. Numbers indicate the number of units in the auxiliary configuration, the fast deployment configuration and the full wartime composition, respectively.
Area of Responsibility	Brigades	Armoured Brigades	Corps headquarters	Independent battalions
Northern	2/6/8	–	0/2/3	2/3/3
Ostrobothnian	0/1/2	–	–	1/3/3
Southern	2/6/9	–	0/1/2	2/4/4
Inner	0/1/3	–	–	0/3/3
Reserves	2/4/8	1/1/2	0/1/2	–
Total	6/18/30	1/1/2	0/4/7	5/13/13

According to Tynkkynen and Jouko, the Finnish Army had sufficient pools of equipment in 1952 to arm the fast deployment complement "tolerably well". Ammunition shortages were, however, expected and "gaping deficiencies" remained in some armaments. For example, a 1956 report concluded that field guns and mortars only had between 10 and 20 percent of the ammunition they were expected to require for a six month campaign.

=== Role of the Finnish Air Force ===
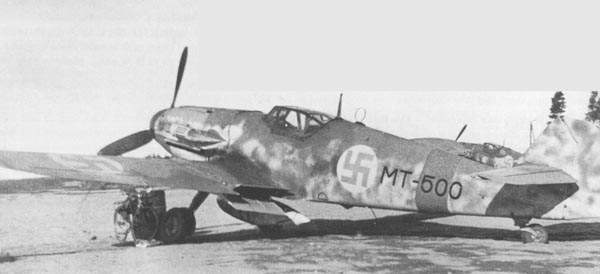
The Finnish Air Force was equipped with World War II era Messerschmitt Bf 109 planes when Polttoainehankinta came to effect in 1952.

Each area of responsibility was associated with a geographically equivalent flight district, each of which was allocated one air brigade. The air force was defined as having four fighter squadrons and one transport squadron in the auxiliary configuration. If a broader mobilization was needed, it would skip the fast deployment configuration and go directly to a full wartime strength of 14 fighter squadrons supported by a transport squadron, a reconnaissance squadron and two night fighter squadrons. The concentration of these assets was to be dependent on whether Sweden was part of the conflict, but six fighter squadrons were assigned to the Northern Area of Responsibility in any scenario.

Anti-aircraft artillery units were to protect priority targets around the country, with the units of the Inner Area of Responsibility acting as reserve for the southern regions. In total, the anti-aircraft artillery forces not assigned as organic components of other units consisted of 57 heavy batteries, 85 light batteries, 10 battalions, and a small number of railway-mounted units. These would be commanded by 15 regimental command posts, 21 heavy artillery battalion command posts and 28 artillery battalion command posts.

The air force was to take a defensive stance, preventing incursions into the Finnish airspace with the help of a country-spanning air surveillance and a radar network. In this defensive role, it would prevent enemy incursions and protect both civilian targets and the logistics network. According to Tynkkynen and Jouko, the plans for air defence were seen as unrealistic even at the time, with the "actual combat effectiveness" of the air force being "regarded as virtual nil" because the available equipment was insufficient. At the time, the Air Force was equipped with a fleet based on the Messerschmitt Bf 109, and did not possess any jet aircraft.

=== Role of Finnish Navy ===
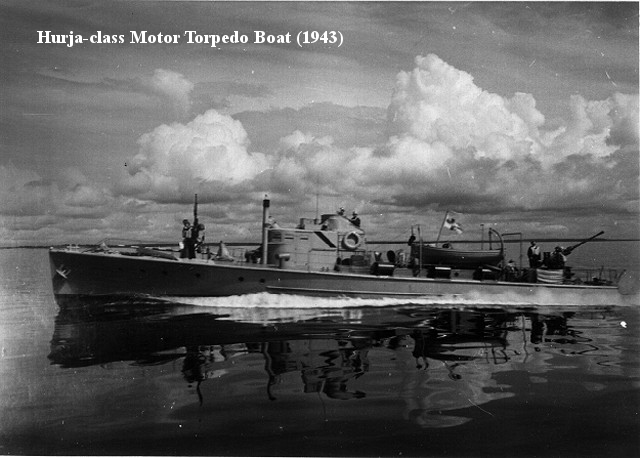
A Hurja class motor torpedo boat. Motor torpedo boats had to be converted to gun boats to abide with the Paris Peace Treaty.

Similar to the air force, the Finnish Navy was to largely skip a medium level of mobilization. In the event of mobilizing beyond the auxiliary component, the auxiliary component size navy would form a "general force" and the freshly mobilized forces would form three maritime districts, namely the Archipelago Maritime District (headquartered in Turku naval base), the Gulf of Bothnia Maritime District (headquartered with the Ostrobothnia Maritime Frontier Guard), and the Gulf of Finland Maritime District (Headquartered in the Helsinki naval base). These districts were known collectively as the "local forces". The most important tasks of the general forces was to secure Åland and the Archipelago Sea.

Division of naval units. Numbers are the number of unit in the auxiliary component configuration and the fast deployment configuration, respectively.
Unit	General forces	Archipelago MD	Gulf of Bothnia MD	Gulf of Finland MD	Total
HQ flotilla	1/1	0/2	–	0/1	4
Escort sqn	1/1	1/1	0/1	0/1	4
Patrol boat sqn	1/1	–	0.5/0	0.5/0	2
Patrol vessel sqn	0/1	–	–	–	1
Fast gunboat sqn	1/2	–	–	–	2
Gun vessel sqn	–	0/1	–	–	1
Minelayer sqn	1/1	0/1	0.5/1	0.5/1	4
Minesweeper sqn	2/2	2/4	1.5/2	2/3	11
Transport vessel sqn	–	1/2	–	0/1	3
Transport sqn	–	1/4	0/1	0.5/2	7

Defensive operations would involve heavy use of naval mines, deployed flexibly based on the scenario. Coastal artillery was to be employed together with the mines to prevent an enemy incursion into the archipelago area and the capture of ports in southern and southwestern Finland. A key task assigned to the Gulf of Finland Maritime District was to safeguard shipping to and from the Soviet-held Porkkala naval base.

Tynkkynen and Jouko describe the Finnish Navy's situation as "equally desperate" to that of the Finnish Air Force. It was limited to 10,000 tonnes by the Paris Peace Treaty, and was forced to scrap its submarine fleet. Restrictions also mandated that all motor torpedo boats had to be rearmed as gunboats. The navy was forbidden from using non-contact naval mines, thus limiting the effectiveness of its "principal weapon system". Stocks of naval mines were also low, at only half of what was viewed as the minimum requirement.

== Plans against Soviet Union ==
Tynkkynen and Jouko observe that the threat modeling underlying Polttoainehankinta was "politically appropriate", and that some of the officers working at the Operations Department of the General Headquarters indicated in 2006 interviews that the scenarios were "militarily unrealistic". A 1960 memo by defence officials further acknowledged that a NATO attack from Norway was unlikely, that only the Soviet Union would be able to fully occupy Finland, and that the largest threat in an unexpected crisis was that posed by the Soviet Union. A similar sentiment was expressed by President Paasikivi, who noted in his diary that "[one] must fulfill the requirements of the FCMA treaty while preparing for the Soviet Union breaking the treaty and attempting to enter the country by force."

Tynkkynen and Jouko state that a highly secret set of plans for a Soviet invasion were produced in parallel with the Polttoainehankinta plans. These alternative plans focused on halting a Soviet surprise attack along the coastal roads of south-eastern Finland with river Kymi being the main defensive line. According to Tynkkynen and Jouko, similar parallel plans were made for subsequent operations orders as well. As evidence, they point to fragments remaining of a plan codenamed Matkakertomus (lit. 'Travelogue') that was developed concurrently with Valpuri. A plan entitled "Strategic general plan KALERVO for defence of the realm" was developed concurrently with an operations order accepted in 1966.

Tynkkynen attributes the lack of archival evidence for early post-World War II defensive plans focusing on the Soviet Union to the FCMA treaty, which would have required Finns to display their defensive plans to the Soviet Union upon request. As such, very little east-facing planning was put in writing, and what was written down was only known to a highly limited number of people.

== Western plans and perceptions ==
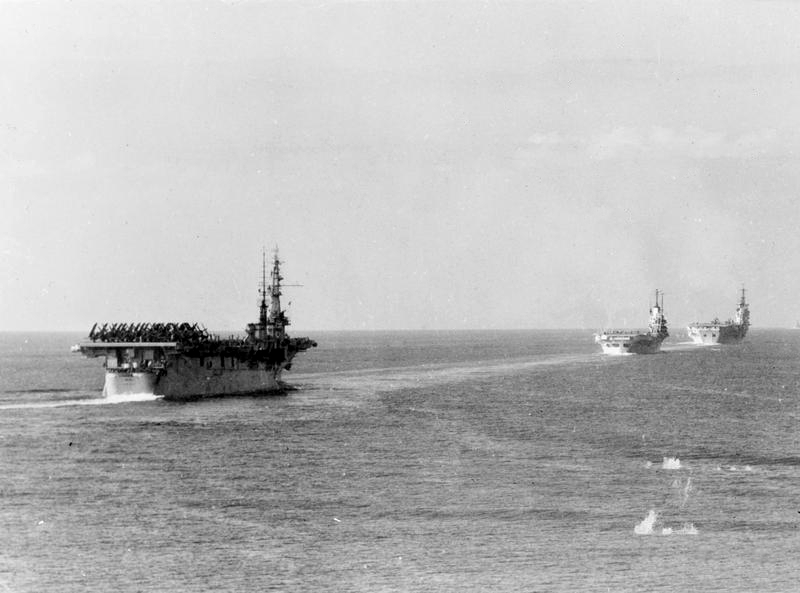
Three aircraft carriers steaming in line ahead in the North Sea during the NATO exercise "Mainbrace", in September 1952.

A 1948 British threat assessment was concerned about a potential Soviet attack by between one and three divisions through northern Finland towards northern Norway and, potentially, Sweden. Such an attack would support a broader effort to secure the Baltics by capturing the Danish straits. Otherwise Finland was seen as a buffer zone, both in general and for Leningrad in specific.

Further US and UK assessments in the early 1950s found that any Soviet actions in the north would be unlikely except as part of a larger Central European operation. In such a scenario, it was believed the Soviets could deploy some 10 divisions in northern Scandinavia. The majority of these would be focused on attacking Sweden through northern Finland. UK assessments concluded that Finland was likely to allow the Soviet Union access for such attacks on Sweden and Norway, assuming that the requests were indeed limited to northern Finland. In case of requests to access southern Finland, the Finns were expected to oppose any Soviet attempts.

Both Swedish and American estimates were skeptical of the Finns' ability to oppose any Soviet attempt to establish passage to the Swedish border beyond a day or two. Tynkkynen and Jouko observe, however, that these estimates appear to assume the Finns would only mobilize to the lowest Treaty of Paris compliant level. At the same time, US estimates determined that any Soviet attack on Finland would result in guerilla warfare, making an attack on Finland alone not worth the effort.

== Modifications and replacement ==
Polttoainehankinta had to be updated almost immediately, when many peacetime regiments were merged into brigades to reduce the number of garrisons. These modifications came into effect in July 1953 under the codename Aluetuotanto (lit. 'Area(l) Production'). It was also observed that the troop configurations of Polttoainehankinta would be unsuitable for a scenario where war broke out between USSR and the Western Powers but Finland remained neutral: the treaty-abiding auxiliary complement would be too small to effectively safeguard the Finnish neutrality, while the fast deployment configuration was deemed too expensive to deploy for a longer time while Finland still technically remained out of the war. As a solution, a neutrality securing forces (puolueettomuuden valvontajoukot, abbreviated PUVA) deployment was developed in 1956. These forces would consist of the last two age groups to complete their conscription, totaling 6 brigades.

The Polttoainehankinta plans were criticized. According to Tynkkynen and Jouko, the most common criticism related to the "complex command structure and slow execution of the system": a mobilization plan that would take weeks or even months to implement was seen as incompatible with a threat analysis which was most concerned with a surprise attack. Also problematic was the very high level of secrecy, where key civilian authorities could not be contacted or briefed before mobilization. Tynkkynen calls the level of secrecy "obsessive", exemplifying the statement of with an anecdote of a military district commander being given a mission of holding the Punkaharju Ridge but not being told whether to expect an attack from the east or the west.

The return of Porkkala in January 1956 launched an effort to completely renew the operations order, and a revised operations order codenamed Valpuri was approved in December 1957. Following the approval of Valpuri, copies of Polttoainehankinta were largely destroyed.
