= Savonlinna =

Municipality in South Savo, Finland

Savonlinna Nyslott
- Town
- Savonlinnan kaupunki Nyslotts stad
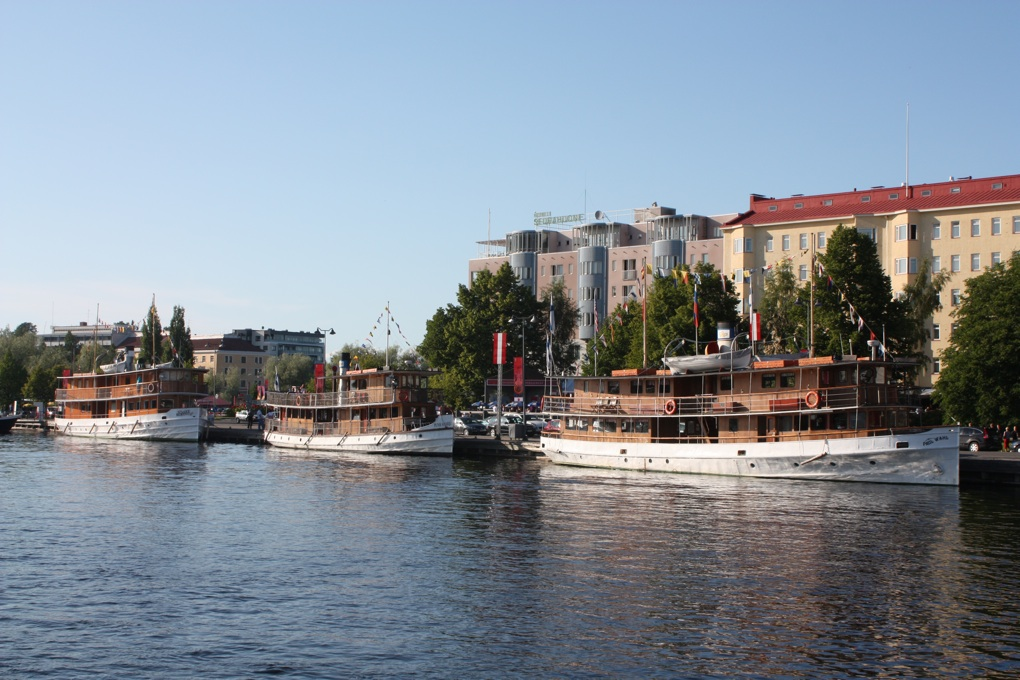
- Harbour of Savonlinna in 2009.

- Coat of arms
- Nickname: Capital of Saimaa
- Location of Savonlinna in Finland
- Interactive map of Savonlinna
- Coordinates: 61°52′05″N 028°53′10″E
- Country: Finland
- Region: South Savo
- Sub-region: Savonlinna
- Charter: 1639

Government
  - Town manager: Ding Ma

Area (2018-01-01)
  - Total: 3,597.70 km^{2} (1,389.08 sq mi)
  - Land: 2,237.87 km^{2} (864.05 sq mi)
  - Water: 762.62 km^{2} (294.45 sq mi)
  - Rank: 27th largest in Finland

Population (2025-12-31)
  - Total: 31,008
  - Rank: 36th largest in Finland
  - Density: 13.86/km^{2} (35.9/sq mi)

Population by native language
  - Finnish: 93.6% (official)
  - Swedish: 0.1%
  - Others: 6.2%

Population by age
  - 0 to 14: 11.6%
  - 15 to 64: 55.6%
  - 65 or older: 32.8%
- Time zone: UTC+02:00 (EET)
  - Summer (DST): UTC+03:00 (EEST)
- Website: www.savonlinna.fi/en/

Savonlinna (UK: /ˌsɑːvɒnˈlɪnə/, Finnish: [ˈsɑʋonˌlinːɑ], lit. 'Castle of Savo'; Swedish: Nyslott, lit. 'New Castle') is a town in Finland, located in the eastern interior of the country. It lies in the Finnish Lakeland, the South Savo region. The population of Savonlinna is approximately 31,000, while the sub-region has a population of approximately 38,000. It is the 36th most populous municipality in Finland.

Savonlinna is located in the heart of the Saimaa Lakeland, which is why it is also known as the "Capital of Saimaa". Together with Mikkeli, they are the two largest towns in the South Savo region and both are centres of the region's hospital districts. Savonlinna enclaves the municipality of Enonkoski.

Savonlinna is internationally known for its medieval St. Olaf's Castle and the annual Savonlinna Opera Festival.

== History ==
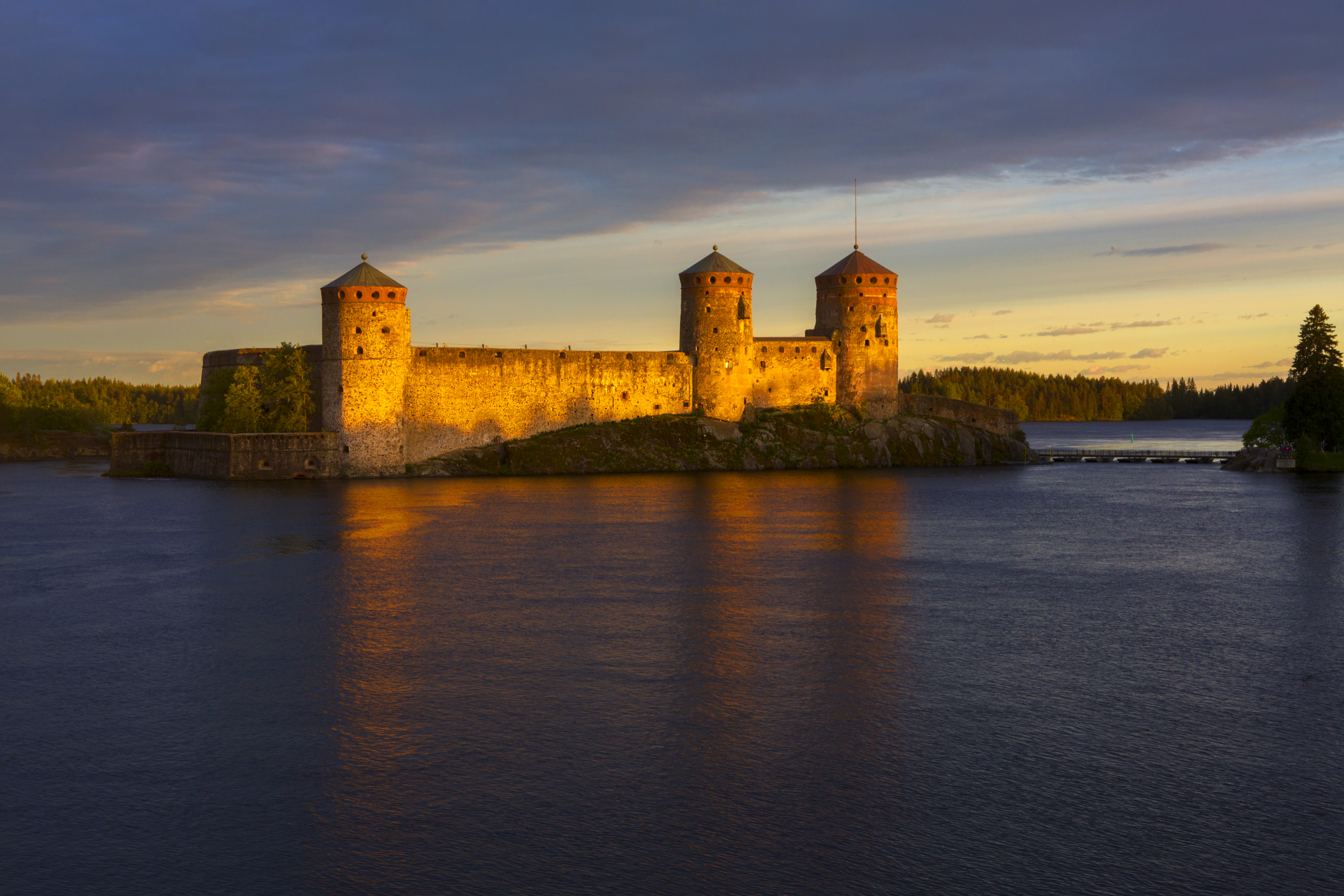
Olavinlinna is a 15th-century three-tower castle.

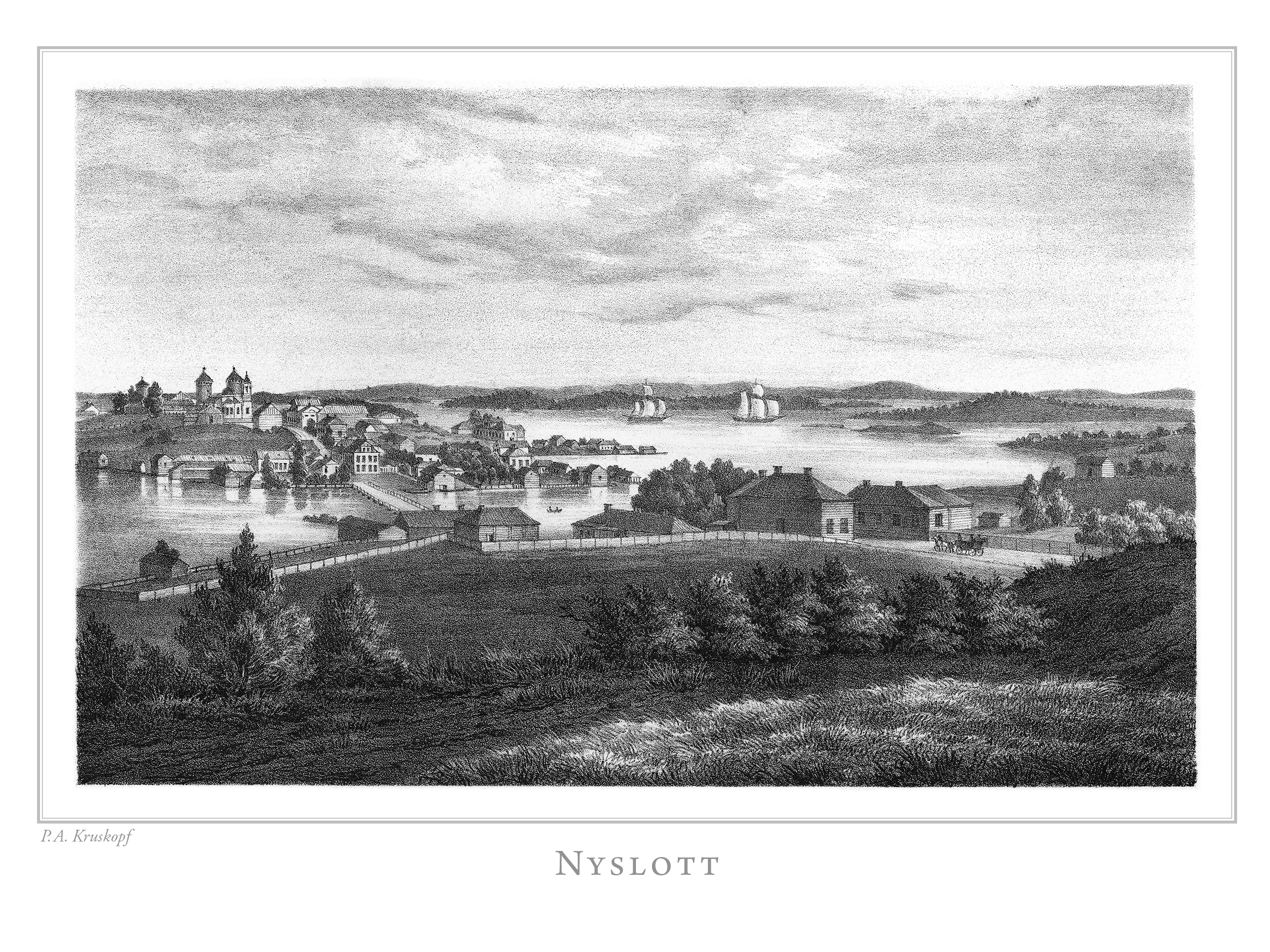
Illustration in Finland framstäldt i teckningar edited by Zacharias Topelius and published 1845–1852.

The city was founded in 1639, based on Olavinlinna castle (St. Olaf's Castle). The castle was founded by Erik Axelsson Tott in 1475 in an effort to protect Savo and to control the unstable border between the Kingdom of Sweden and its Russian adversary. During the Russo-Swedish War (1741–1743), the castle was captured by Field-Marshal Peter Lacy. It was held by Russia between 1743 and 1812, when it was granted back to Finland as a part of "Old Finland".

In 1973 the municipality of Sääminki was consolidated with Savonlinna. In the beginning of year 2009 the municipality of Savonranta and a 31.24 km^{2} (12.06 sq mi) land strip from Enonkoski between Savonlinna and Savonranta were consolidated with Savonlinna. In the beginning of the year 2013, the municipalities of Kerimäki and Punkaharju were consolidated with Savonlinna.

== Attractions ==
The most notable attraction in Savonlinna is the Olavinlinna castle, a 15th-century castle built on an island. Near the castle is also the Savonlinna regional museum. Some other attractions include the forest museum Lusto in the village of Punkaharju, and the Kerimäki Church in the neighboring village of Kerimäki, which is the largest wooden church in the world.

Savonlinna hosts the famous annual Savonlinna Opera Festival, which was held first time in 1912. The operas are performed on a stage built inside the Olavinlinna castle. The city has also hosted the Mobile Phone Throwing World Championships since 2000.

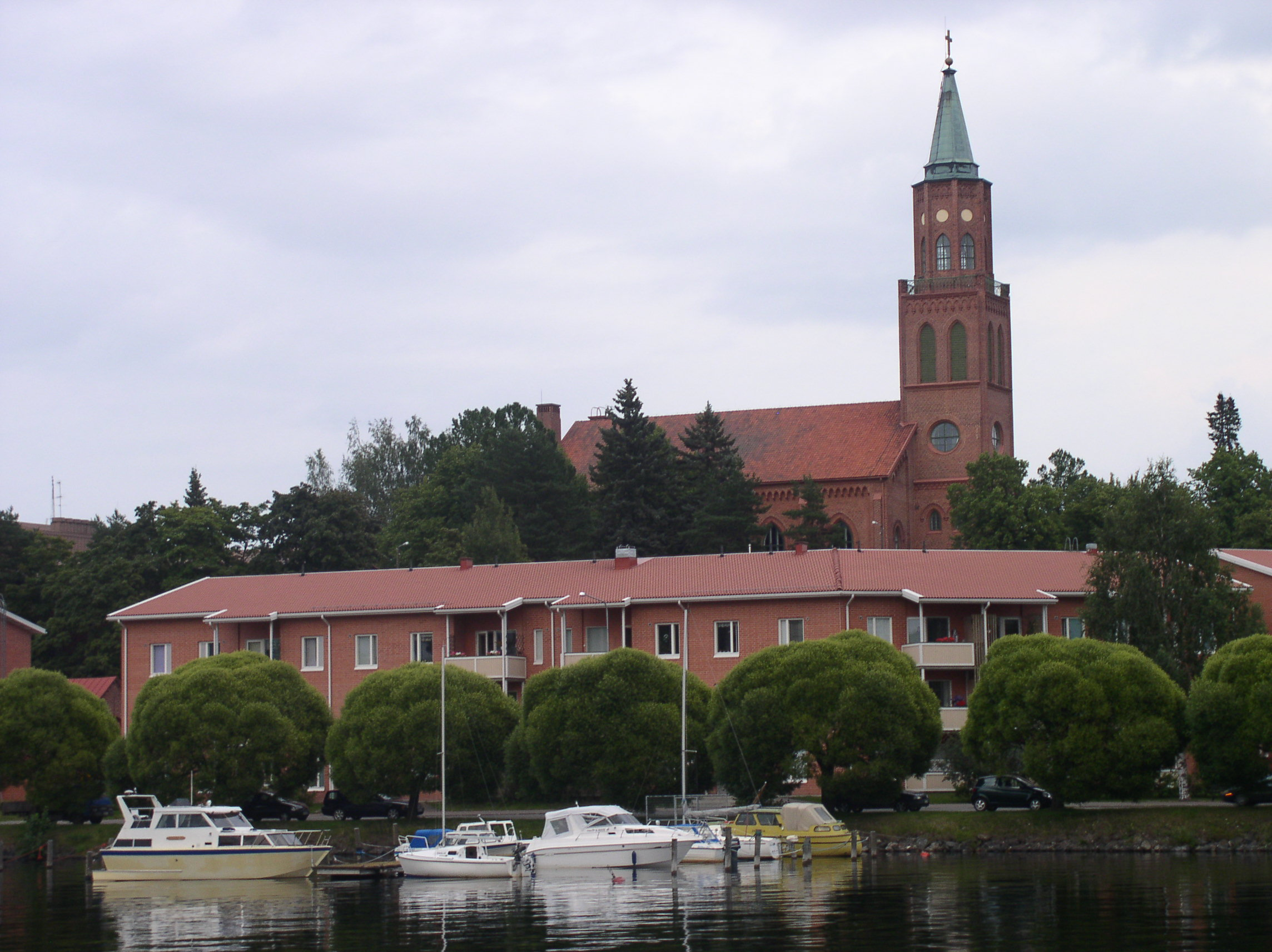
Savonlinna Cathedral is an Evangelical Lutheran Church

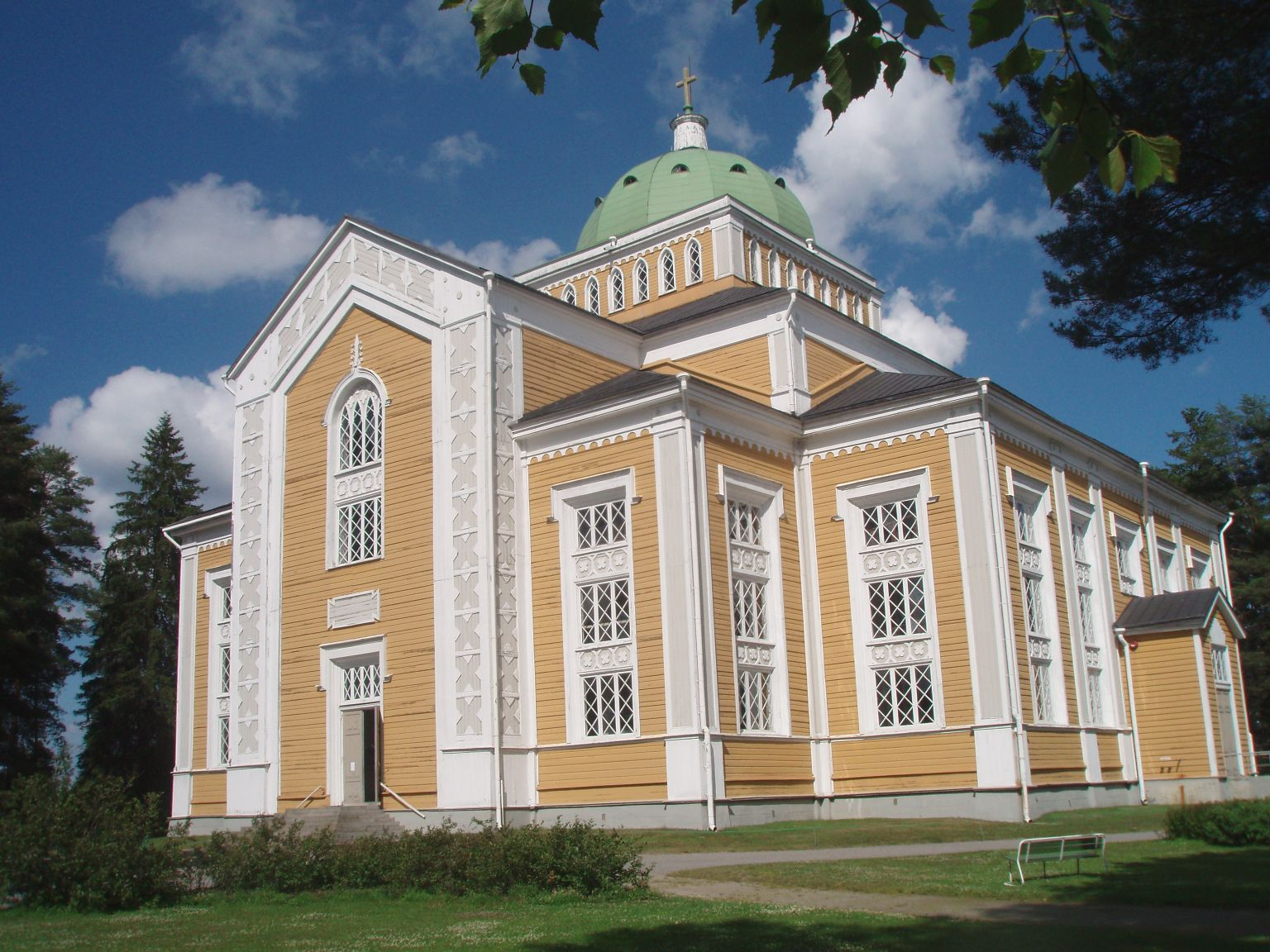
Kerimäki Church is the biggest wooden church in the world.

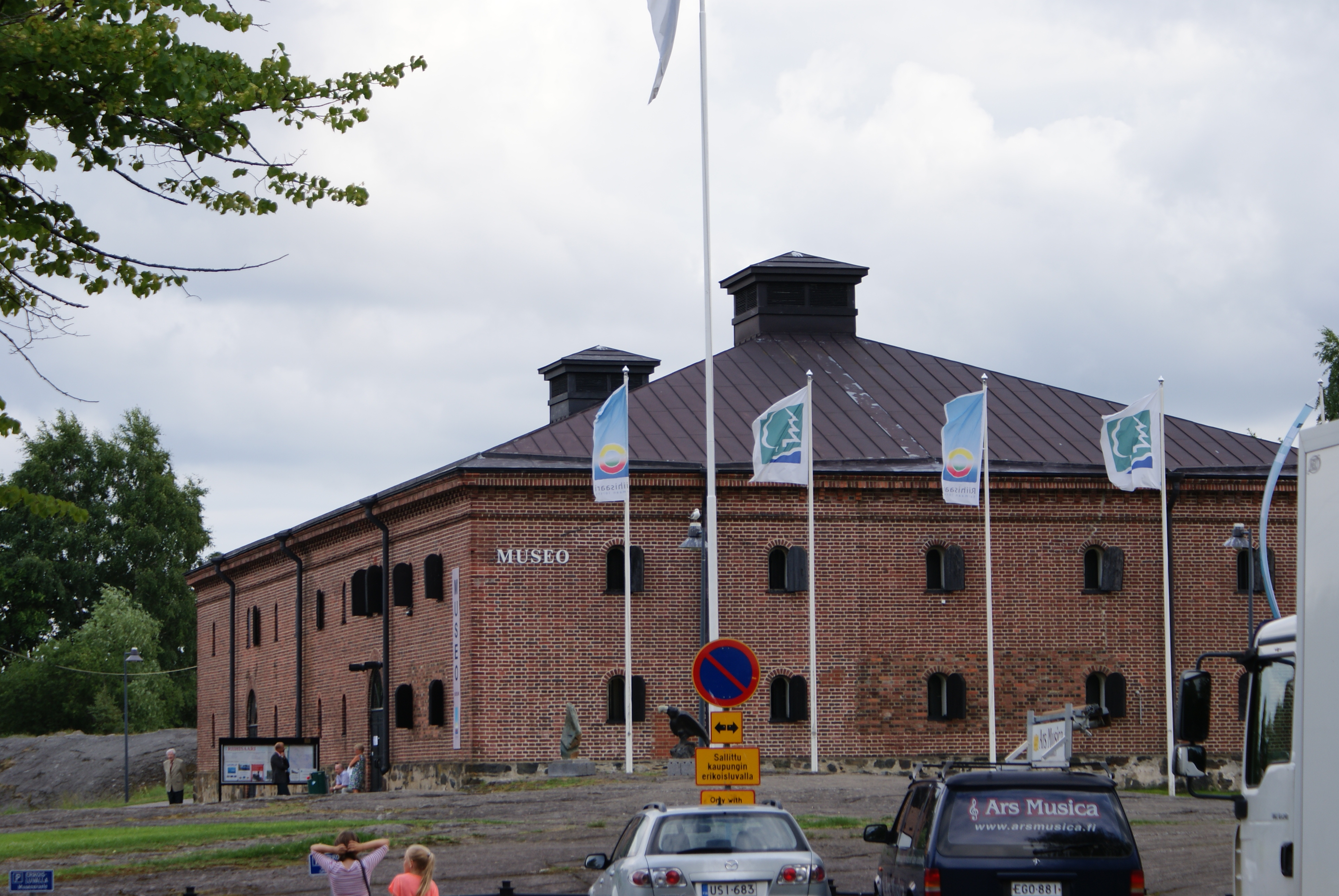
Savonlinna Provincial Museum

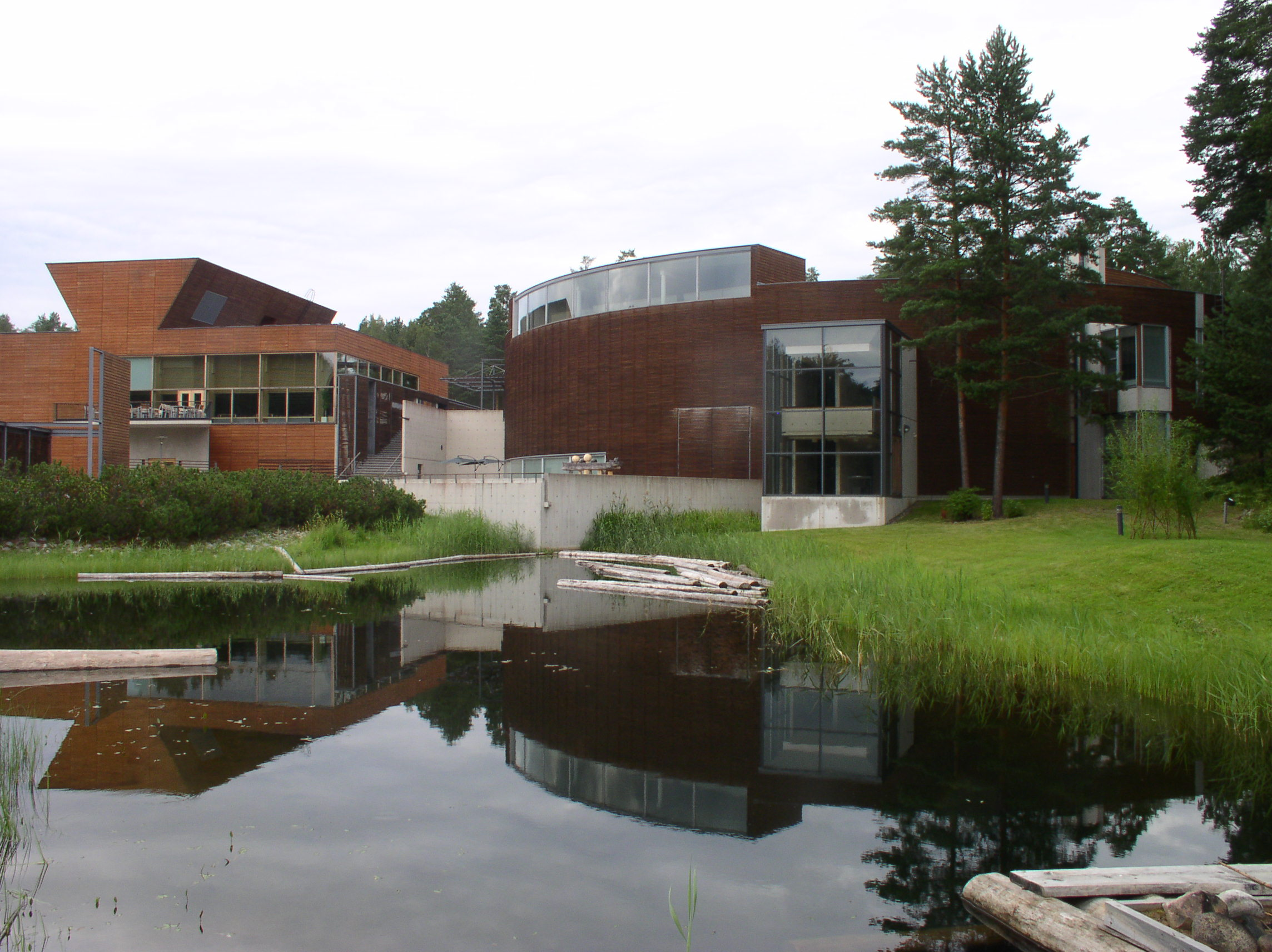
Lusto is a national forest museum is located in Punkaharju

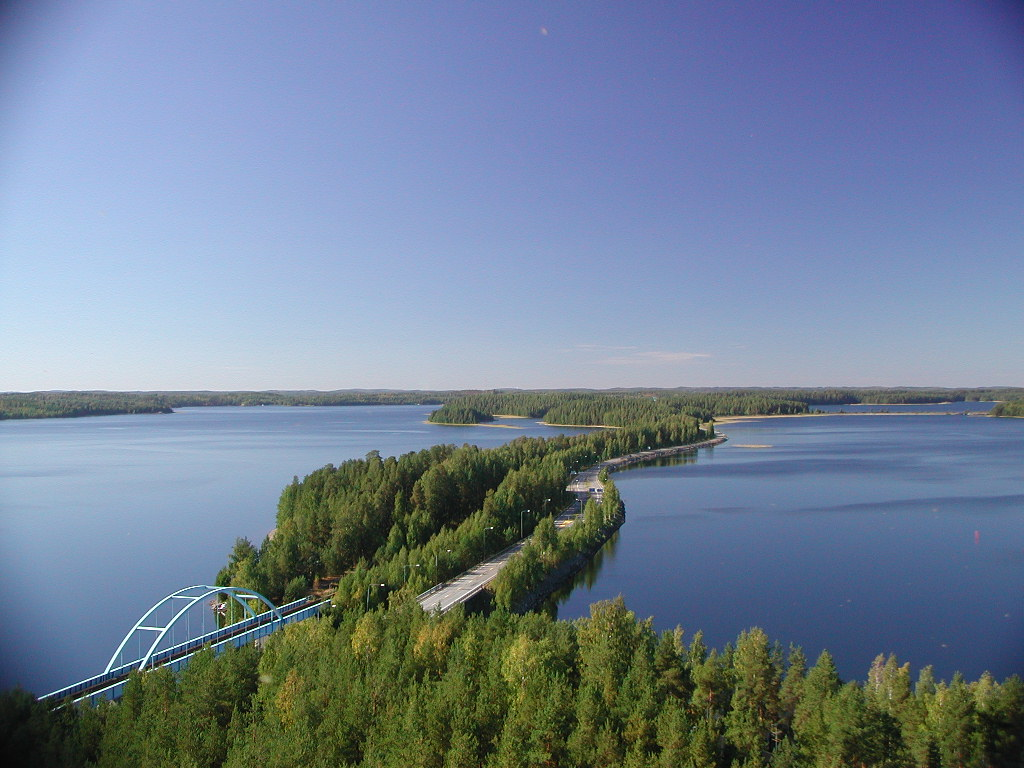
Punkaharju Ridge nature reserve

== Climate ==
Climate data for Savonlinna Punkaharju Laukansaari (1991–2020, extremes 1959–present)
Month	Jan	Feb	Mar	Apr	May	Jun	Jul	Aug	Sep	Oct	Nov	Dec	Year
Record high °C (°F)	6.9 (44.4)	8.7 (47.7)	14.1 (57.4)	22.5 (72.5)	28.9 (84.0)	32.8 (91.0)	32.6 (90.7)	32.3 (90.1)	27.5 (81.5)	18.3 (64.9)	11.7 (53.1)	8.9 (48.0)	32.8 (91.0)
Mean daily maximum °C (°F)	−4.5 (23.9)	−4.4 (24.1)	0.9 (33.6)	7.3 (45.1)	14.6 (58.3)	19.3 (66.7)	22.0 (71.6)	19.9 (67.8)	14.1 (57.4)	7.0 (44.6)	1.4 (34.5)	−2.2 (28.0)	8.0 (46.4)
Daily mean °C (°F)	−7.4 (18.7)	−7.7 (18.1)	−3.3 (26.1)	2.6 (36.7)	9.4 (48.9)	14.5 (58.1)	17.3 (63.1)	15.5 (59.9)	10.5 (50.9)	4.5 (40.1)	−0.6 (30.9)	−4.5 (23.9)	4.2 (39.6)
Mean daily minimum °C (°F)	−10.6 (12.9)	−11.3 (11.7)	−7.5 (18.5)	−1.7 (28.9)	4.4 (39.9)	10.0 (50.0)	13.3 (55.9)	12.0 (53.6)	7.5 (45.5)	2.3 (36.1)	−2.5 (27.5)	−7.2 (19.0)	0.7 (33.3)
Record low °C (°F)	−40.2 (−40.4)	−38.0 (−36.4)	−33.2 (−27.8)	−22.6 (−8.7)	−10.2 (13.6)	−0.5 (31.1)	4.7 (40.5)	−0.3 (31.5)	−4.4 (24.1)	−11.3 (11.7)	−25.9 (−14.6)	−36.0 (−32.8)	−40.2 (−40.4)
Average precipitation mm (inches)	42 (1.7)	34 (1.3)	35 (1.4)	29 (1.1)	42 (1.7)	62 (2.4)	69 (2.7)	78 (3.1)	62 (2.4)	62 (2.4)	52 (2.0)	52 (2.0)	619 (24.4)
Average precipitation days	11	10	9	7	8	10	10	10	10	12	12	12	121
Source 1: FMI normals 1991-2020
Source 2: Record highs and lows 1959- present

== Demographics ==
Population size 1990–2025
Year	Population
1990	41,359
1995	41,426
2000	39,575
2005	38,451
2010	37,059
2015	35,523
2020	32,662
2025	31,008

== Sports ==
The ice hockey team of Savonlinna, SaPKo or Savonlinnan Pallokerho, is playing in the second tier Mestis.

The top-tier volleyball team Saimaa Volley plays some of its home matches in Savonlinna. The football team Savonlinnan Työväen Palloseura (STPS), is playing in Kolmonen, the fourth tier.

== Transport ==
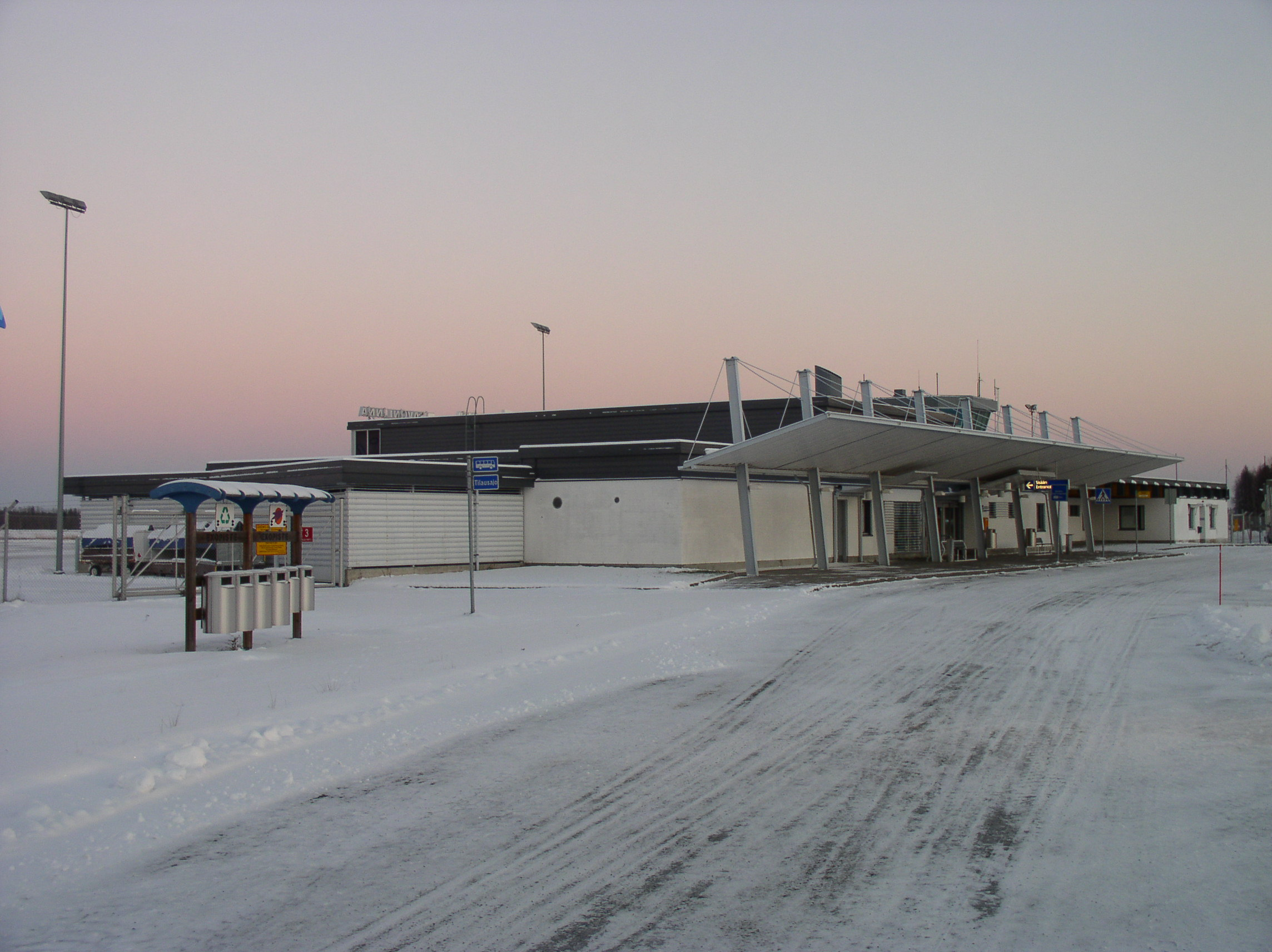
Savonlinna Airport

Savonlinna is located 104 kilometres (65 mi) east of Mikkeli, 133 kilometres (83 mi) west of Joensuu and 159 kilometres (99 mi) south of Kuopio. It is also 335 kilometres (208 mi) from the capital city of Helsinki by road, and some four hours away by train. Flights from Savonlinna Airport to Helsinki take 40–60 minutes.

== Education ==
South-Eastern Finland University of Applied Sciences has a campus in Savonlinna, teaching healthcare as well as process technologies. Research and development facilities include laboratories for wood processing and electronics. University of Eastern Finland had a campus in Savonlinna, primarily for teacher education. The campus was shut down in 2018.

There are two high schools in Savonlinna. One of these high schools is specialized in art subjects, which when it started its operation in 1967 was the first specialized high school in Finland as well as in all of the Nordic countries.

== International relations ==
=== Twin towns — Sister cities ===
Savonlinna is twinned with:

- Detmold, Germany
- Kalmar, Sweden
- Torzhok, Russia
- Budavár (Budapest), Hungary

In addition, there is non-governmental cooperation with the following cities:

- Árborg, Iceland
- Arendal, Norway
- Silkeborg, Denmark

== Notable people ==
- Hannu Aravirta, former professional hockey forward, coach for the Finnish national men's team, SM-liiga and Elitserien
- Arto Heiskanen, professional hockey left winger
- Kari Hietalahti, actor
- Ere Kokkonen, film director and screenwriter
- Hanna Kosonen, politician and ski-orienteer
- Erik Laxmann, explorer and natural scientist
- Ville Leino, former professional hockey forward
- Petri Matikainen, ice hockey coach
- Jarmo Myllys, former professional hockey goaltender, member of the 1988, 1994 and 1998 Finnish Olympic ice hockey teams
- Pasha Pozdniakova, Finnish-Russian Playboy model and social media influencer
- Joonas Rask, professional hockey forward for HIFK
- Tuukka Rask, former professional hockey goaltender, member of the 2014 Finnish Olympic ice hockey team
- Heikki Silvennoinen, actor and musician
- Pekka Tirkkonen, ice hockey coach

== See also ==
- Enonkoski
- St. Olaf's Castle
- Savo (historical province)
- Savonlinna Opera Festival
- Punkaharju Ridge
