= Pasha Pozdniakova =

Finnish-Russian model, entrepreneur and social media influencer (born 1999)

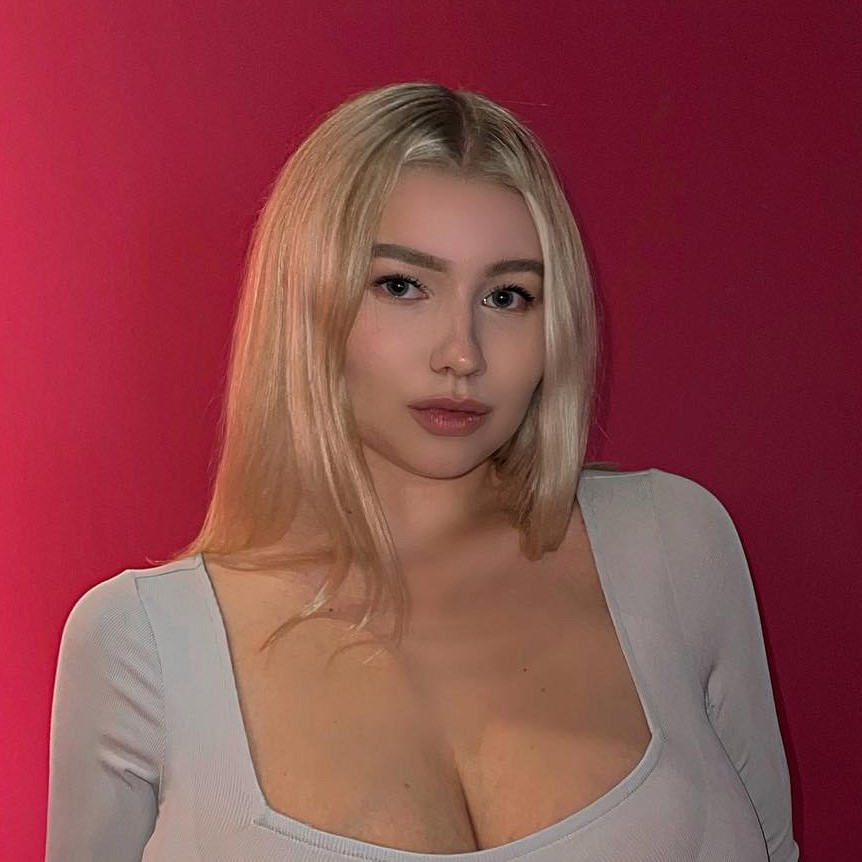
- Pozdniakova in St. Petersburg in 2021
- Born: Praskovia Pozdniakova; 15 April 1999 (age 27); Saint Petersburg, Russia
- Other name: Miss Paraskeva
- Education: Savonlinna Senior Secondary School of Art and Music
- Occupations: Model, social media influencer, entrepreneur
- Years active: 2017–present
- Height: 5 ft 6 in (1.68 m)

Praskovia "Pasha" Pozdniakova (born 15 April 1999) is a Finnish-Russian model, entrepreneur, and social media influencer. She performs under the stage-name MissParaskeva. She is especially known for her appearance in the 2021 South-African edition of Playboy magazine.

Pozdniakova lived in Russia until she was 13, after which the family moved to Finland and settled in the town of Savonlinna, and in 2020 Pozdniakova and her family received Finnish citizenship. Pozdniakova studied at Savonlinna Senior Secondary School of Art and Music and graduated from there in 2018. Pozdniakova moved to Helsinki in 2020, but in 2022 she returned to Savonlinna, where she lives today.

Pozdniakova started her social media career in high school by making YouTube videos. In August 2022, her Instagram account had two million followers. Pozdniakova also makes content for TikTok and Twitch.

Pozdniakova has spoken in public in favor of body positivity, and said that she thinks all kinds of women are beautiful. Although she often appears in scantily-clad pictures, she has said that she dresses conservatively in her spare time and does not want to be seen as an erotic model.

In February 2025, Pozdniakova told her followers on Instagram that she is now part of the Finnish Center Party and will be running as a candidate in the Savonlinna at 2025 Finnish municipal elections.
