= Monastic Community of Enonkoski =

Lutheran monastery in Enonkoski, Finland

Coordinates: 62°10′08″N 028°48′32″E

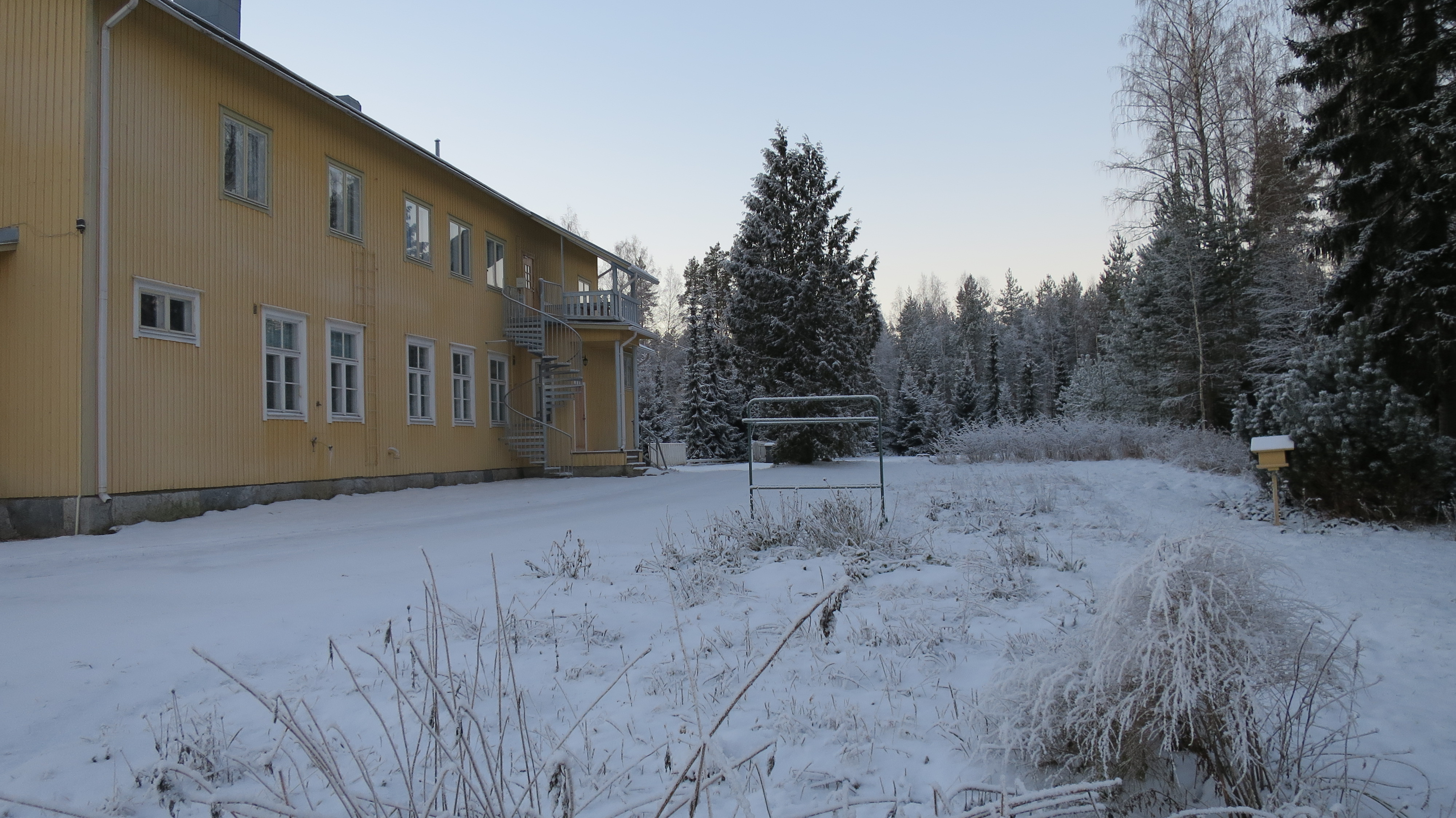
Enonkoski Monastery

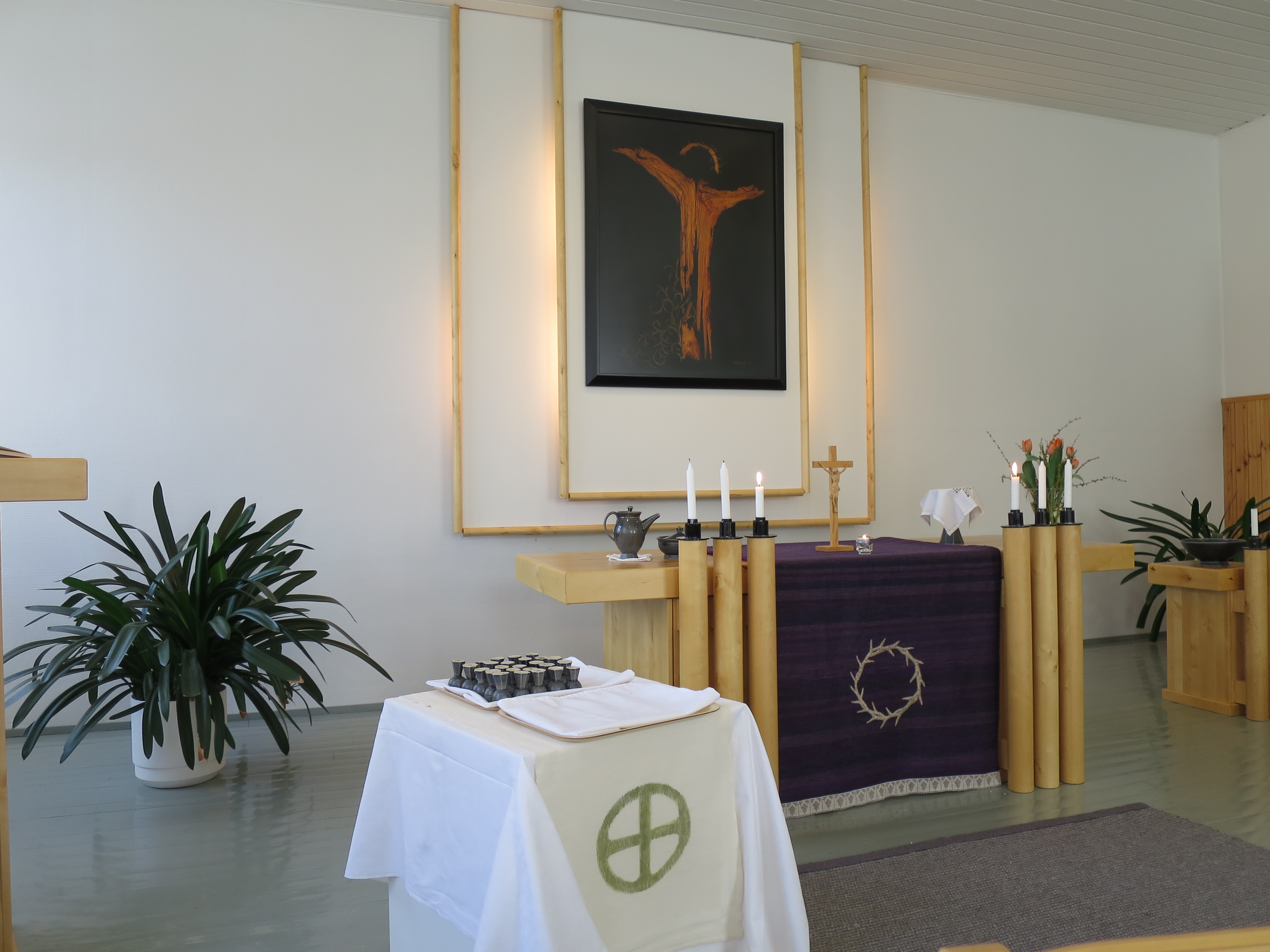
The Chapel of Holy Trinity in the Enonkoski monastery

The Monastic Community of Enonkoski is an Evangelical Lutheran Christian monastery in Finland. It is located in the village of Ihamaniemi in the Enonkoski municipality. The monastery building previously served as elementary school. The monastery was founded in 1994. There are currently no permanent residents in the monastery.

In 2017 the Evangelical Lutheran Diocese of Mikkeli took an active role in the management of the monastery programmes to organize retreats and promote prayer and Christian lifestyle. At the initiative of the bishop of Mikkeli Seppo Häkkinen, the synod of the Evangelical Lutheran Church of Finland decided to grant a three-year allowance for a recruiting a pastor to promote retreat activity and spiritual guidance in the congregations of Mikkeli and Kuopio dioceses.

== See also ==
- Finnish Evangelical Lutheran Prayer Brotherhood
- List of Christian religious houses in Finland
