= Enonkosken Pyrintö =

Finnish volleyball club

Enonkosken Pyrintö is a volleyball club from Enonkoski, Finland. The men's team of Pyrintö is playing in the second highest tier of Finnish volleyball, Southern group of 1-sarja. Team's coach is Bulgarian Todor Marinov.

Pyrintö was founded in 1919. Formerly it was a multi-sports club. The most famous and successful athlete of the club is runner Antti Loikkanen.

== Current squad ==
- Mika Nenonen
- Petri Siitonen
- Jussi Lautiainen
- Antti Pölönen
- Mika Kettunen
- Eetu Pennanen
- Kalle Heikkinen
- Juuso Paananen
- Teemu Saarinen
- Markus Tammaru

In Sprint 2010 Saimaa Volley players Kirill Borichev and Markus Väisänen play also for EnPy.
