= Confraternity of priests =

Voluntary associations of Catholic priests

Confraternities of priests are communities of ordained members within the Catholic Church. These societies, in distinction from the many confraternities open to lay persons, reached an important place of influence in the Roman Catholic Church by the end of the nineteenth century. At that point, the Apostolic Union, the Priests' Eucharistic League, and the Priests' Communion League, had become widely established in many countries. There were also such confraternities operating nationally.

== Description ==
A confraternity is a society of persons associated with some pious object. The members are linked together by a bond of brotherhood for mutual co-operation in the pursuit of a specific object of religion or charity by means of prayer, example, and counsel. A confraternity of priests in the strict sense of the word seeks before all else the personal sanctification of its members. Sacerdotal confraternities have as their common objective to preserve priests from the dangers of spiritual and social isolation, and to afford them something of that mutual support which belongs to a religious community. The particular aims of priests' confraternities may be reduced to three: personal holiness, ecclesiastical learning, and mutual financial aid. Financial assistance embraces cases of sickness and old age, as well as loans, medical attendance, and legal advice.

== Examples ==
The Confraternity of Catholic Clergy was founded in 1975. It is an association of Catholic Priests and Deacons in the United States who are pledged to the pursuit of personal holiness, loyalty to the Roman Pontiff, commitment to theological study and strict adherence to the authentic teachings of the Magisterium.

The Australian Confraternity of Catholic Clergy was founded in 1987.

The Irish Confraternity of Catholic Clergy was established in 2013.
