= Puruvesi =

Lake in the country of Finland

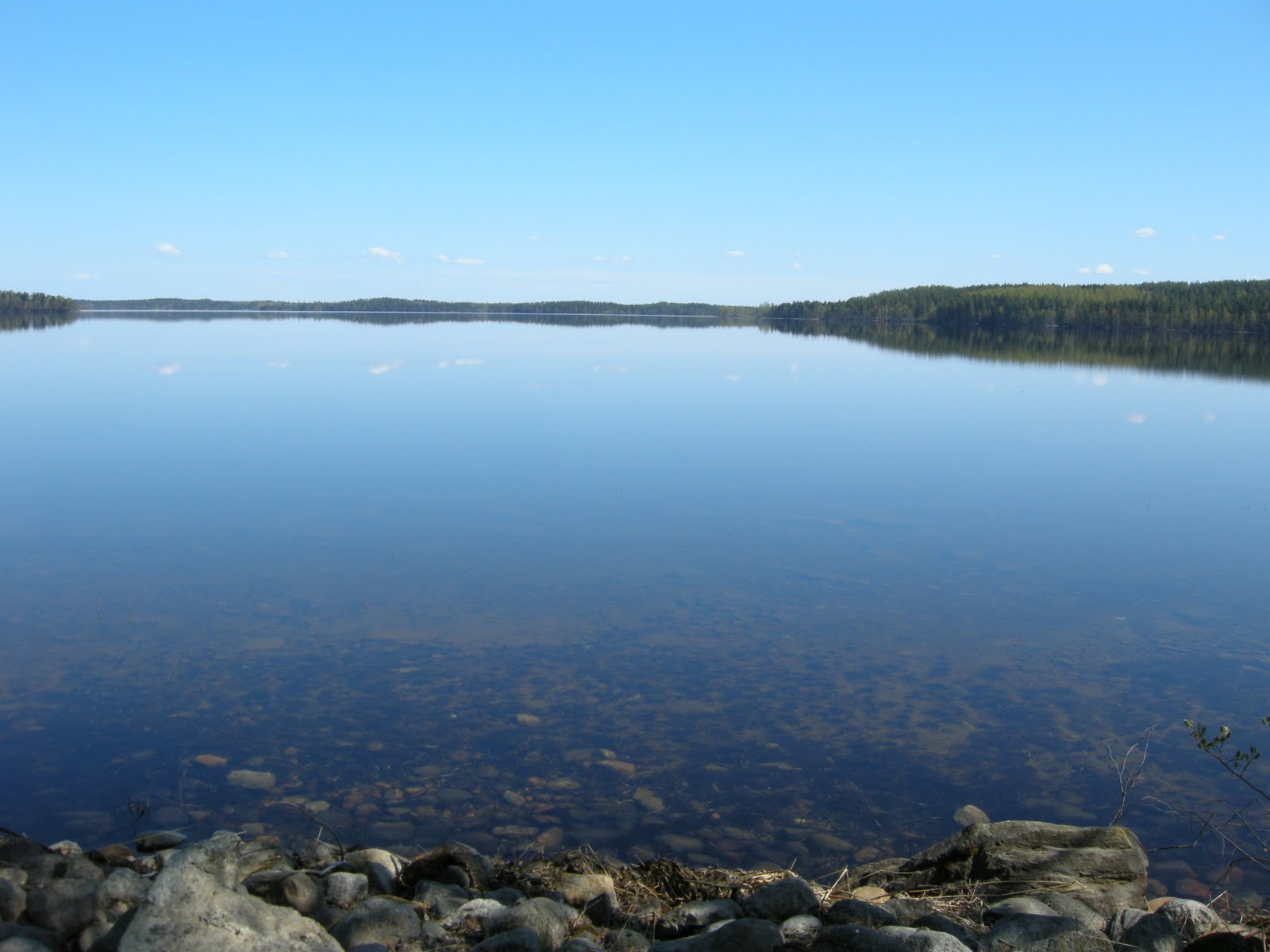

- Location within Finland
- Location: Eastern Finland
- Coordinates: 61°50′N 029°27′E
- Basin countries: Finland
- Surface area: 420.86 km^{2} (162.49 sq mi)
- Average depth: 8.76 m (28.7 ft)
- Max. depth: 61 m (200 ft)
- Water volume: 3,655 km^{3} (2.963×10^{9} acre⋅ft)
- Shore length^{1}: 923.97 km (574.13 mi)
- Surface elevation: 75.7 m (248 ft)
- Islands: 720
- Settlements: Kerimäki, Kesälahti, Punkaharju
- ^{1} Shore length is not a well-defined measure.

Puruvesi is a lake in Eastern Finland. The lake is located in Kerimäki, Kesälahti and Punkaharju municipalities. Part of the Saimaa lake system, it borders on the sub-lake system of Pihlajavesi to the south. As is the case of other lakes of Saimaa, it has numerous islands and consists of numerous open lake areas, of which largest are Hummonselkä, Pajuselkä, Sammalselkä, Mustanselkä, and Ruosteselkä.

The lake is known for its pure water and underwater visibility that extends to 6–10 metres (20–33 ft) from the surface on calm and sunny days.

Recently, the Saimaa Ringed Seal, a rare freshwater seal species, has returned to Puruvesi. Sightings of this animal have occurred frequently in 2006, 2007 and 2008. At least one seal was also sighted in the winter of 2009 as having wintered and given birth in the eastern part of Puruvesi.
