= Kerimäki =

- Former municipality
- Kerimäen kunta Kerimäki kommun
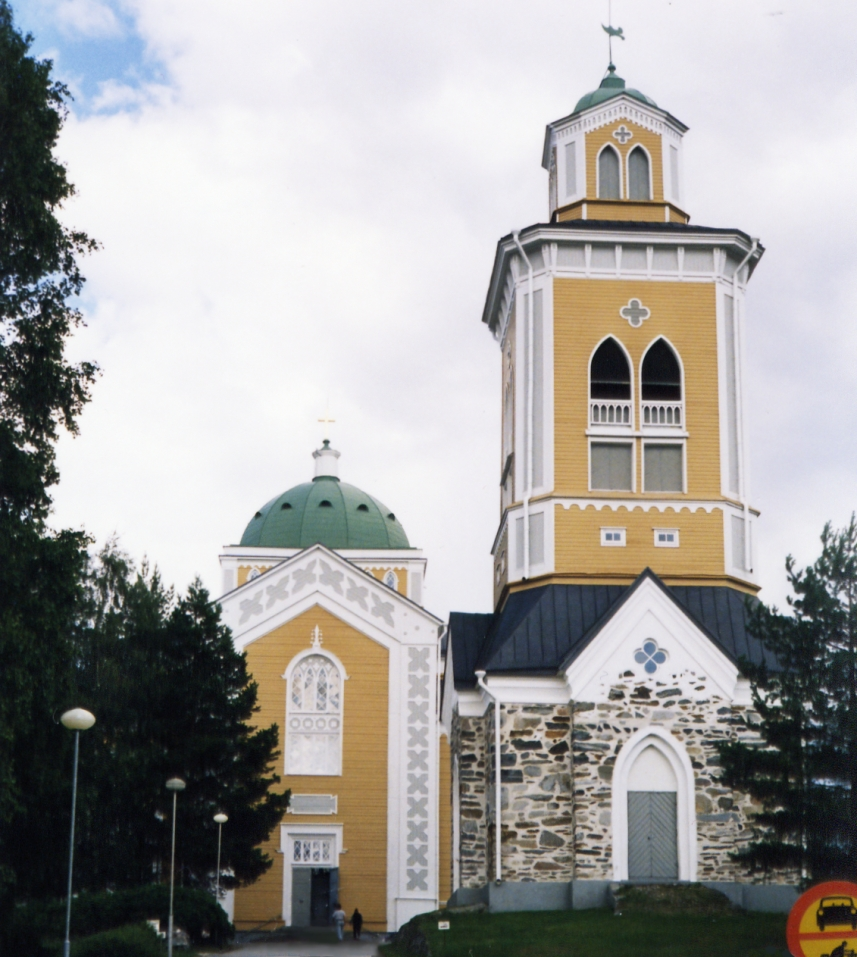
- Kerimäki Church

- Coat of arms

- Location of Kerimäki in Finland
- Coordinates: 61°55′N 029°17′E
- Country: Finland
- Region: South Savo
- Sub-region: Savonlinna sub-region
- Charter: 1642
- Consolidated: 2013

Area
  - Total: 876.46 km^{2} (338.40 sq mi)
  - Land: 557.65 km^{2} (215.31 sq mi)
  - Water: 318.81 km^{2} (123.09 sq mi)

Population (2012)
  - Total: 5,526
  - Density: 9.909/km^{2} (25.67/sq mi)
- Time zone: UTC+2 (EET)
  - Summer (DST): UTC+3 (EEST)
- Website: www.kerimaki.fi

Kerimäki is a former municipality of Finland. It was consolidated with the town of Savonlinna on January 1, 2013.

It is located in the province of Eastern Finland and is part of the South Savo region. The municipality was unilingually Finnish.

The Kerimäki Church, built between 1844 and 1847, is the largest wooden church in the world (45 metres (148 ft) long, 42 m (138 ft) wide and 37 m (121 ft) high). There are over 3,000 seats inside the structure, which can hold 5,000 people at a time.

Lake Puruvesi, which lies less than a kilometre away from the church, is one of the clearest lakes in the world. The water is pure enough to be potable.
