= Punkaharju =

- Former municipality
- Punkaharjun kunta Punkaharju kommun
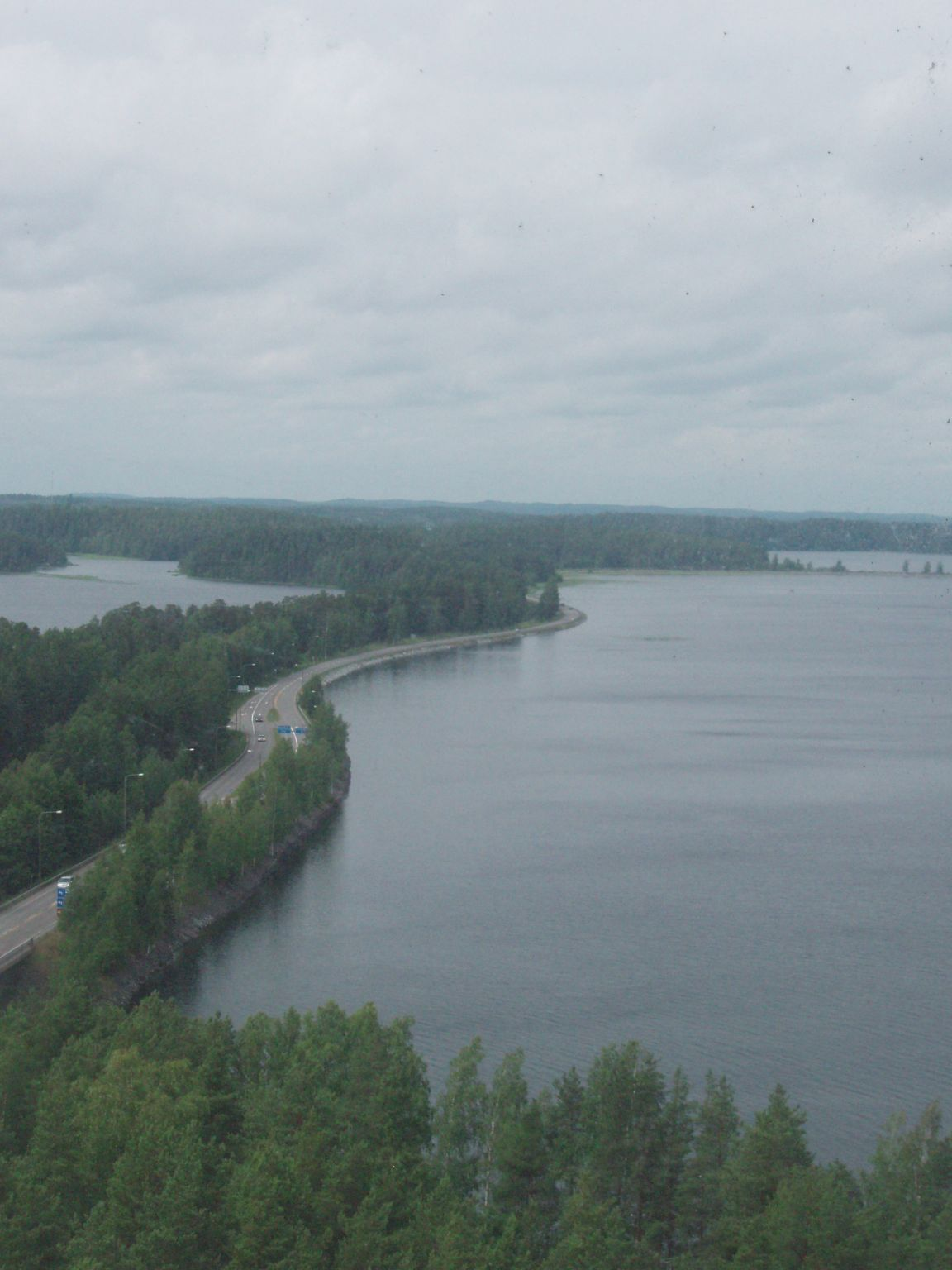
- Punkaharju Ridge

- Coat of arms

- Location of Punkaharju in Finland
- Coordinates: 61°45′N 029°24′E
- Country: Finland
- Region: South Savo
- Sub-region: Savonlinna sub-region
- Charter: 1924
- Consolidated: 2013

Area
  - Total: 748.12 km^{2} (288.85 sq mi)
  - Land: 471.26 km^{2} (181.95 sq mi)
  - Water: 276.86 km^{2} (106.90 sq mi)

Population (31 December 2012)
  - Total: 3,702
  - Density: 7.856/km^{2} (20.35/sq mi)
- Time zone: UTC+2 (EET)
  - Summer (DST): UTC+3 (EEST)
- Website: www.punkaharju.fi

Punkaharju is a former municipality of Finland. It was consolidated with the town of Savonlinna on January 1, 2013.

It was located in the province of Eastern Finland and is part of the South Savo region. The municipality had a population of 3,702 (31 December 2012) and covered an area of 748.12 square kilometres (288.85 sq mi) of which 276.86 km^{2} (106.90 sq mi) was water. The population density was 7.8555/km^{2} (20.3457/sq mi). The municipality was unilingually Finnish.

Finnish Forest Museum Lusto and the Finnish Forest Research Institute are located in Punkaharju, which hosts a research forest park open for visitors. In the park some of the tallest trees in the whole Finland can be found, for example pines in the height of 40 metres (130 ft). The Punkaharju Ridge is a famous national landscape protected by a national reserve.
