= Ylä-Rieveli =

Lake in Finland

- Location within Finland
- Coordinates: 61°25′N 26°29′E
- Basin countries: Finland
- Surface area: 33.751 km^{2} (13.031 sq mi)
- Average depth: 9.99 m (32.8 ft)
- Max. depth: 54.41 m (178.5 ft)
- Water volume: 0.337 km^{3} (0.081 cu mi)
- Shore length^{1}: 177.03 km (110.00 mi)
- Surface elevation: 81.9 m (269 ft)
- Frozen: December-April
- Islands: Kuhasaari, Kurittu, Vuohisaari
- Settlements: Pertunmaa
- ^{1} Shore length is not a well-defined measure.

Ylä-Rieveli (also called Ylä-Rääveli) is a medium-sized lake in Finland. It is a lake in the Kymijoki main catchment area, located in the regions Southern Savonia and Päijänne Tavastia. It is connected with another lake, Enonvesi, by the Pirtinsalmi strait.

== See also ==
- List of lakes in Finland
