= Ylä-Enonvesi =

Lake in Enonkoski, Finland

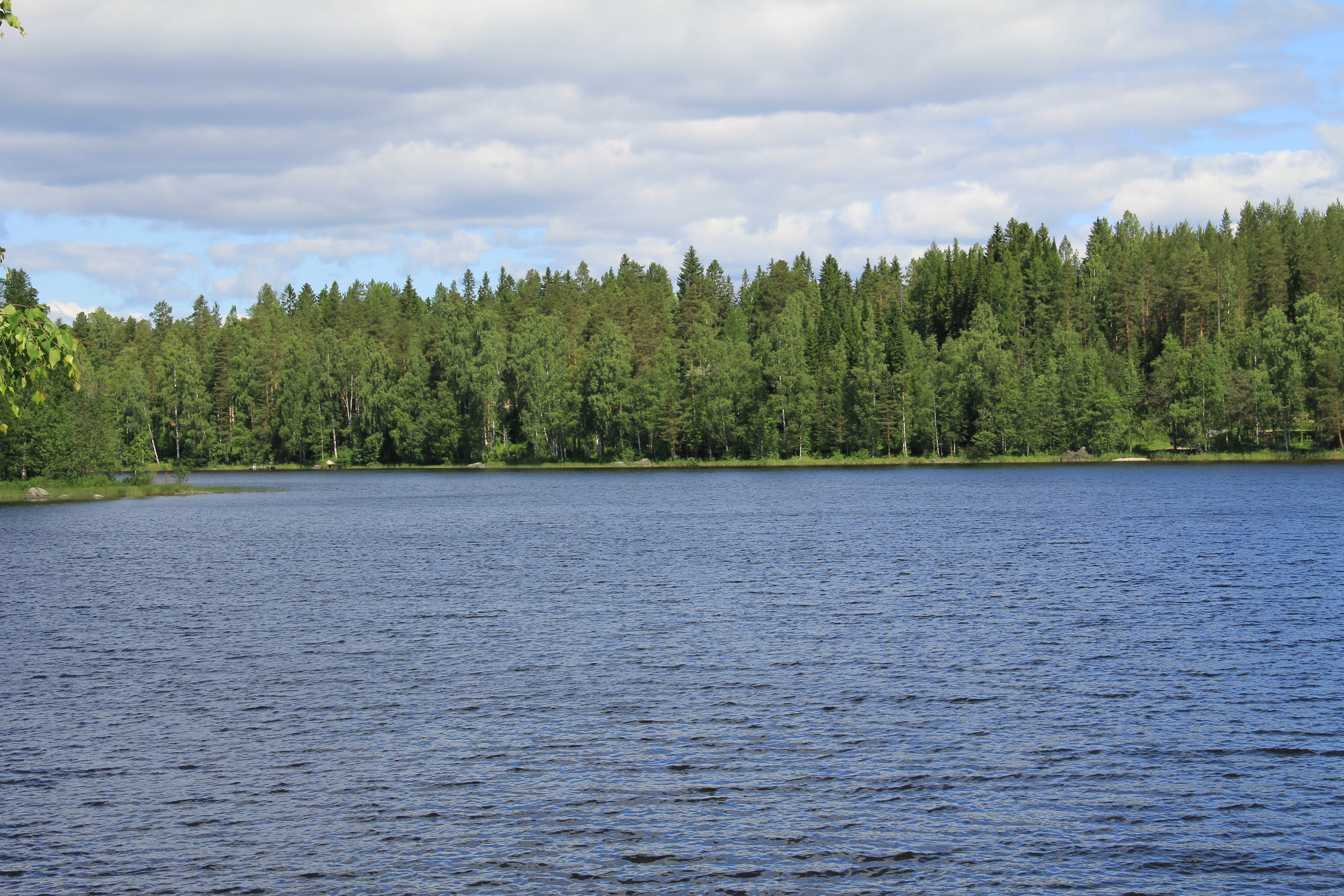

- Location within Finland
- Coordinates: 62.061°N 29.003°E
- Primary inflows: Enonkoski rapids
- Primary outflows: Uitonsalmi
- Catchment area: Vuoksi
- Basin countries: Finland
- Max. length: 9 km (5.6 mi)
- Max. width: 2 km (1.2 mi)
- Surface area: 11.859 km^{2} (4.579 sq mi)
- Shore length^{1}: 74.79 km (46.47 mi)
- Surface elevation: 81 m (266 ft)
- Settlements: Enonkoski
- ^{1} Shore length is not a well-defined measure.

Ylä-Enonvesi is a medium-sized lake in the Vuoksi main catchment area. It is located in the Southern Savonia region in Finland. The lake is important area of fishing industry.

== See also ==
- List of lakes in Finland
