= Punkaharju (esker) =

Esker in Savonlinna, Finland

- Esker
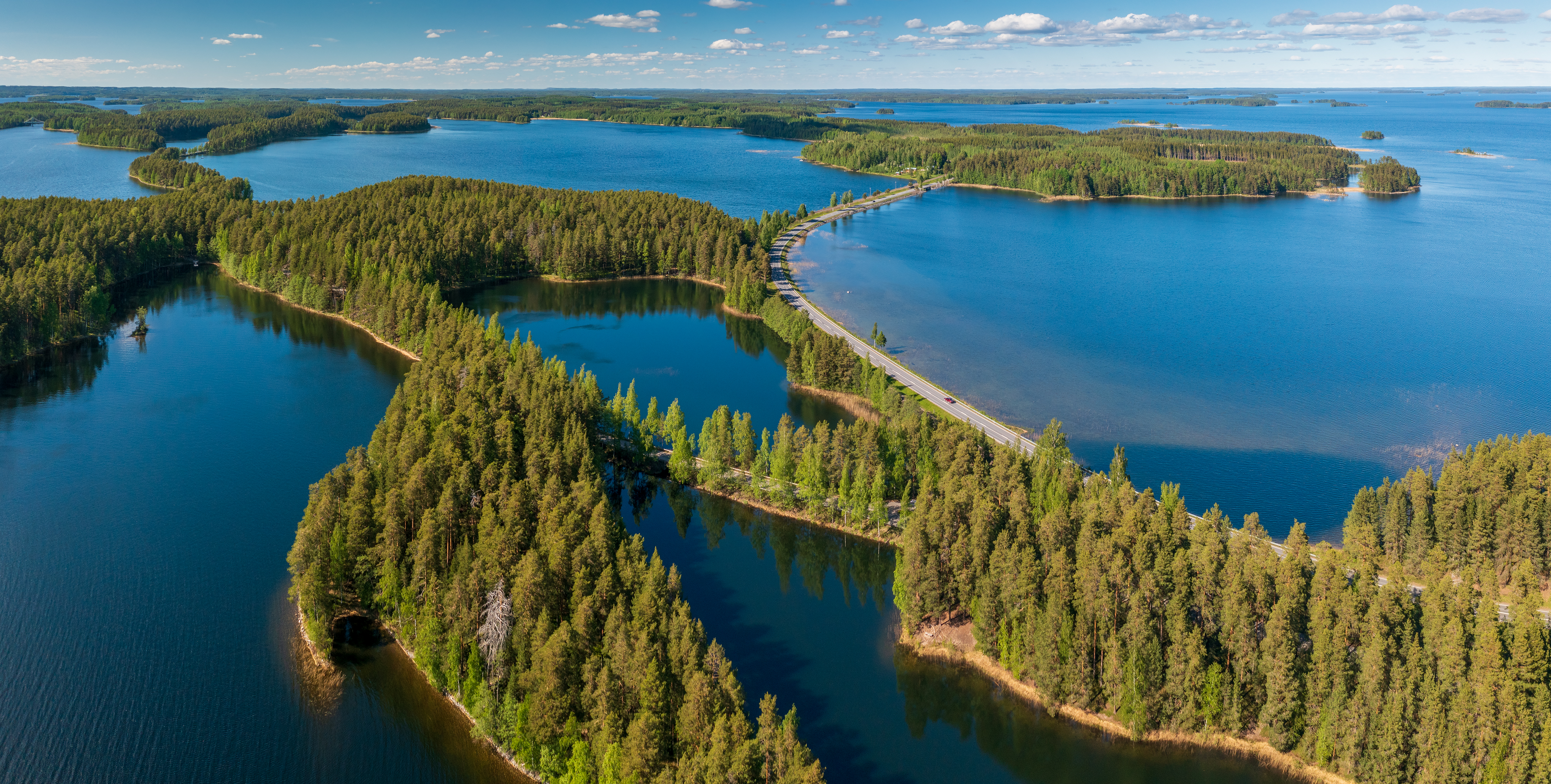
- Aerial view, looking north. National Road 14 can be seen on the right, with the historic scenic route to its left.

- Location within Finland
- Coordinates: 61.7739°N 29.3457°E
- Location: South Savo, Finland
- Water bodies: Saimaa
- Formed by: Last Glacial Period

Area
  - Total: 679 hectares (1,680 acres)

Dimensions
  - Length: c. 7.5 kilometres (4.7 mi)
  - Width: c. 10 metres (33 ft) (minimum)
- Elevation: 31 metres (102 ft) (above mean water level)

Punkaharju is an esker (ridge) in South Savo, southeastern Finland. It separates two lakes of the Saimaa lake system, Puruvesi and Pihlajavesi, with only a narrow strip of dry land and a series of islands visible above water.

Punkaharju is an iconic Finnish national landscape (kansallismaisema), which has inspired artists and writers, and drawn both domestic and international visitors since at least the early 1800s. Czar Alexander I visited the area in 1802 and expressed his wish that it be preserved, and since 1843 it has been protected first as a state park and later as national park. Today, it is a designated nature reserve, and is included in the EU's Natura 2000 programme. The area has also been protected by the Finnish Heritage Agency as a nationally important cultural environment.

The ridge can be traversed by car, either along the National Road 14 (between Savonlinna and Särkisalmi), or the older scenic route 4792. In 2017, to mark the 100th anniversary of Finland's independence, the 'Road of the Century' was chosen by popular poll, with the scenic route ('Harjutie') winning by a clear margin, with 42% of the votes.

== Gallery ==
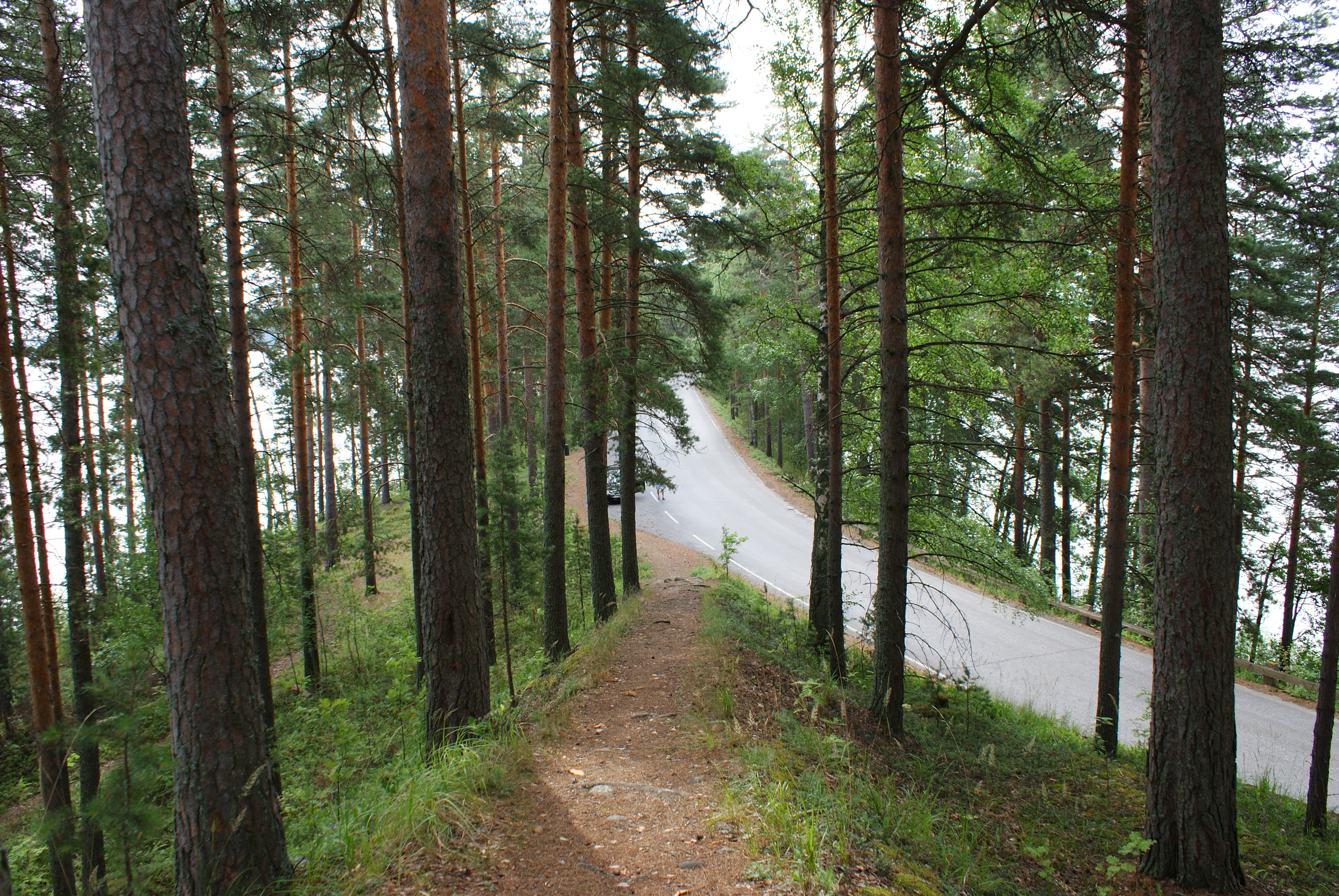
Scenic route 4792 (Harjutie)

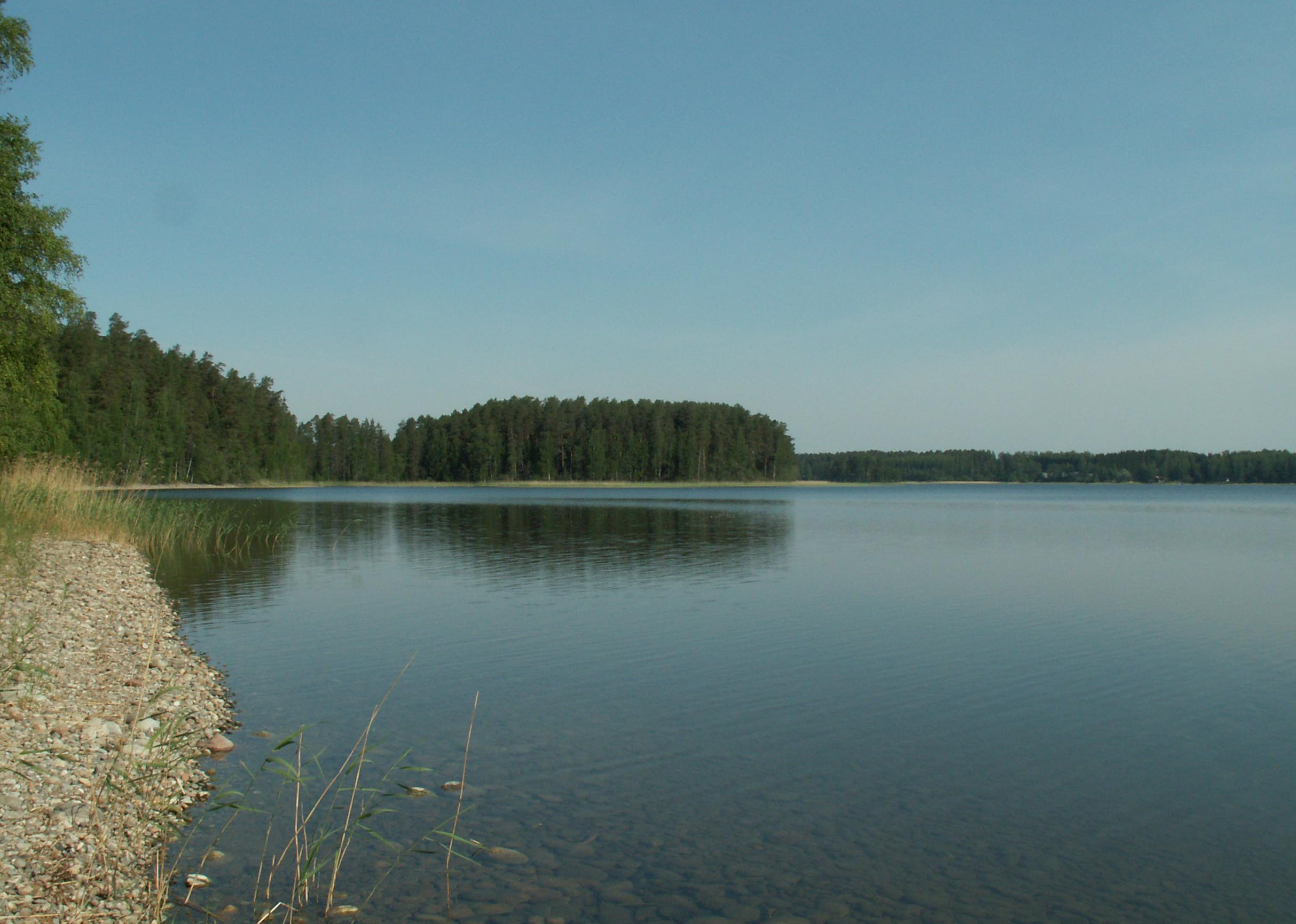
Waterside view

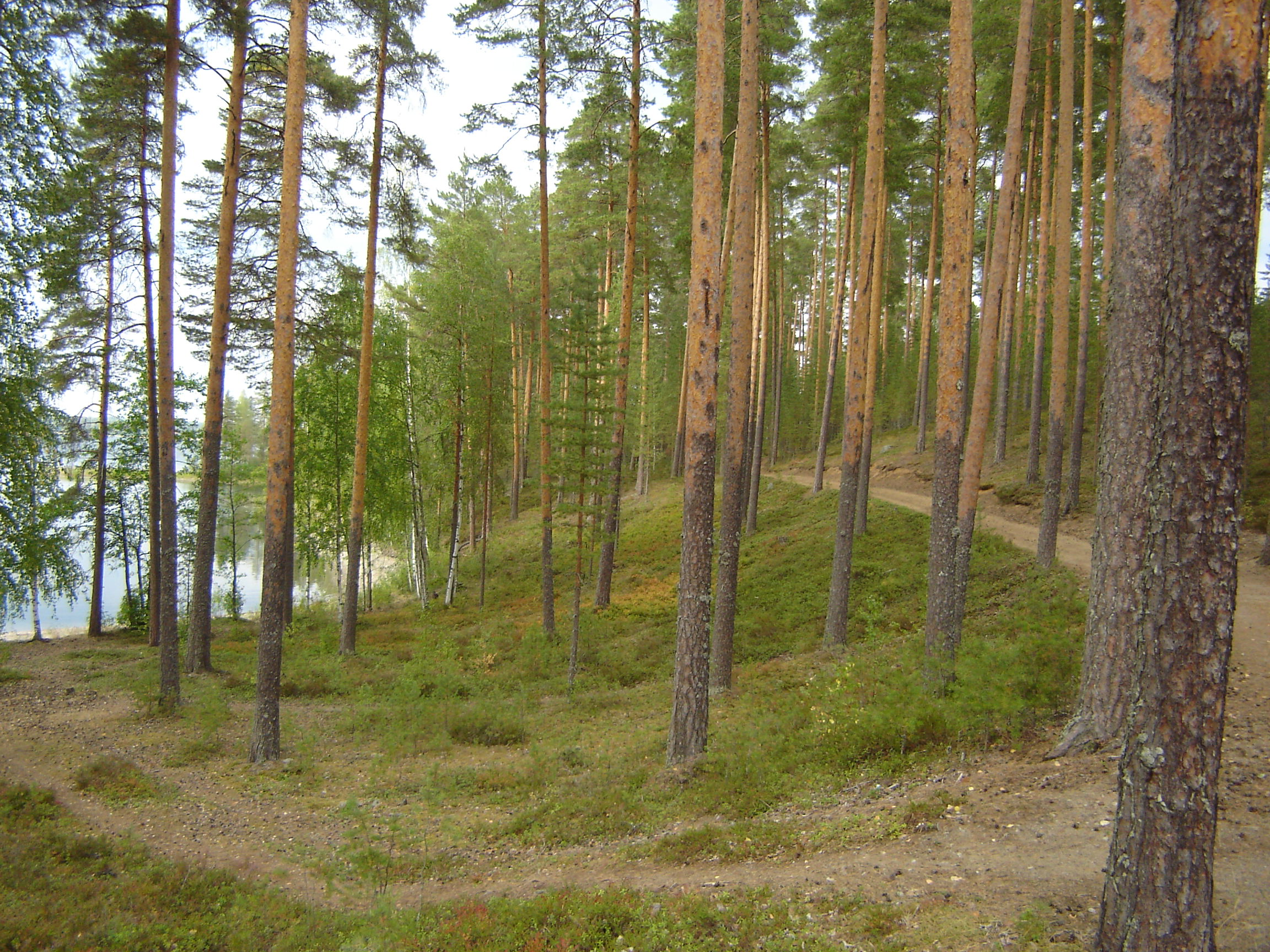
Pine forest typical to the area

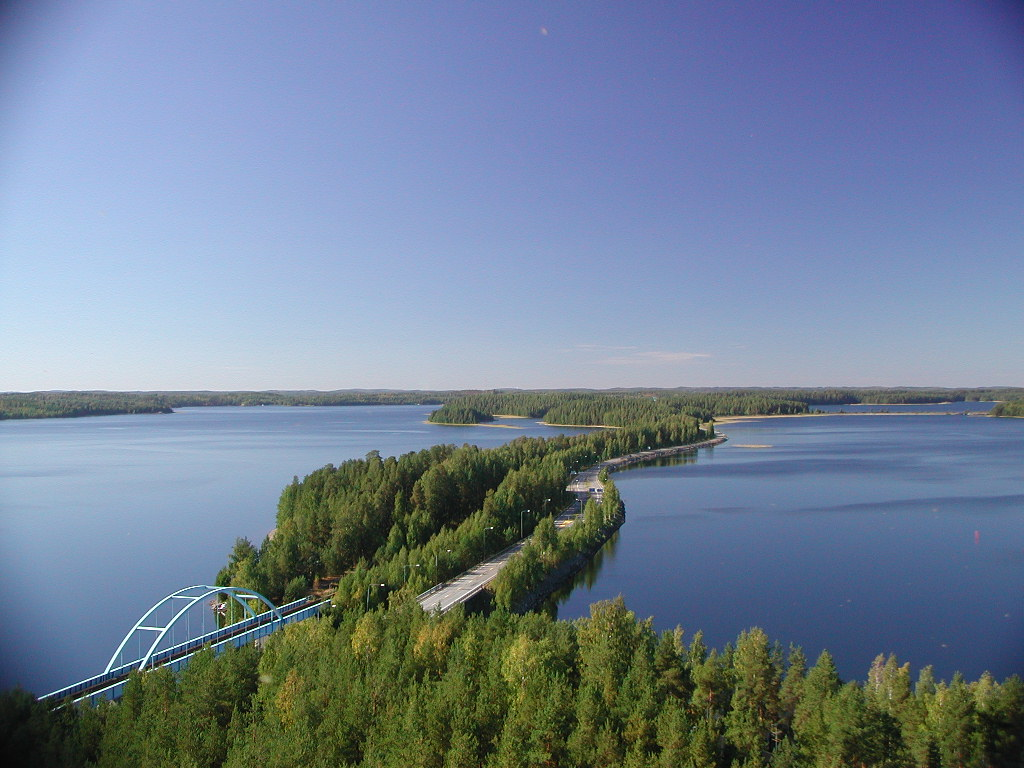
Elevated view from a water tower

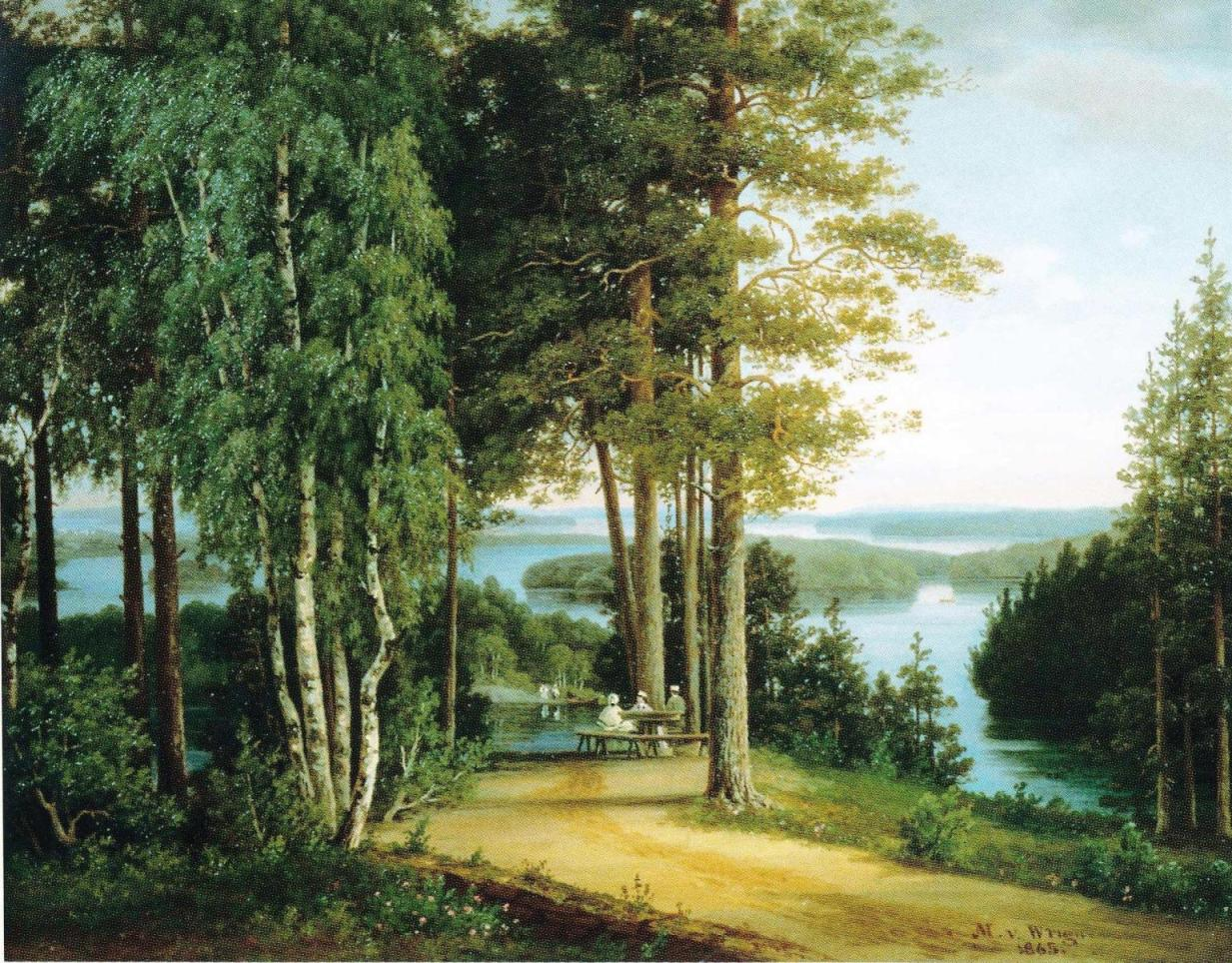
Maisema Punkaharjulta ('View from Punkaharju') by Magnus von Wright (1865)
