= Kerimäki Church =

Church building in Savonlinna, Finland

Coordinates: 61°54′46″N 029°17′06″E

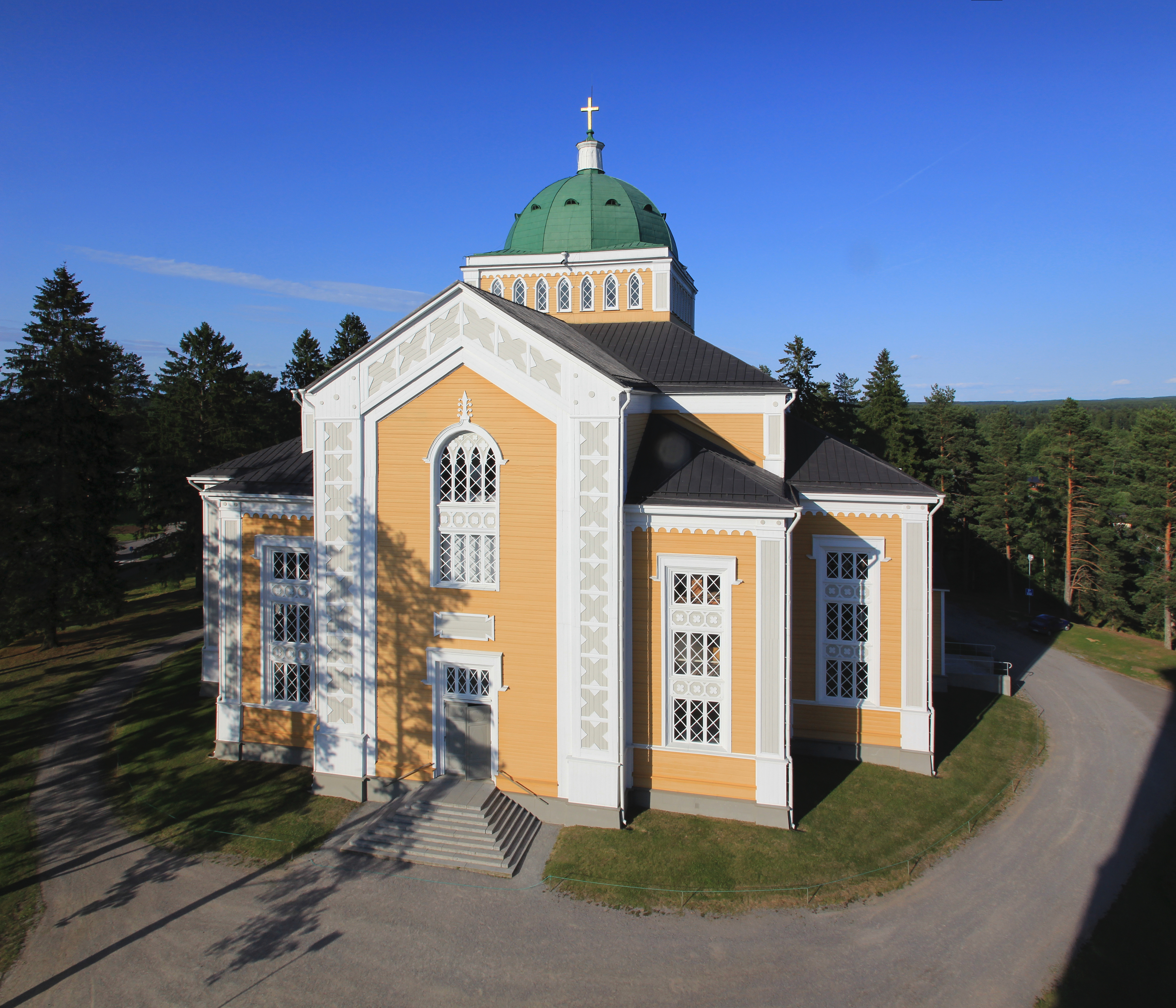
Kerimäki church

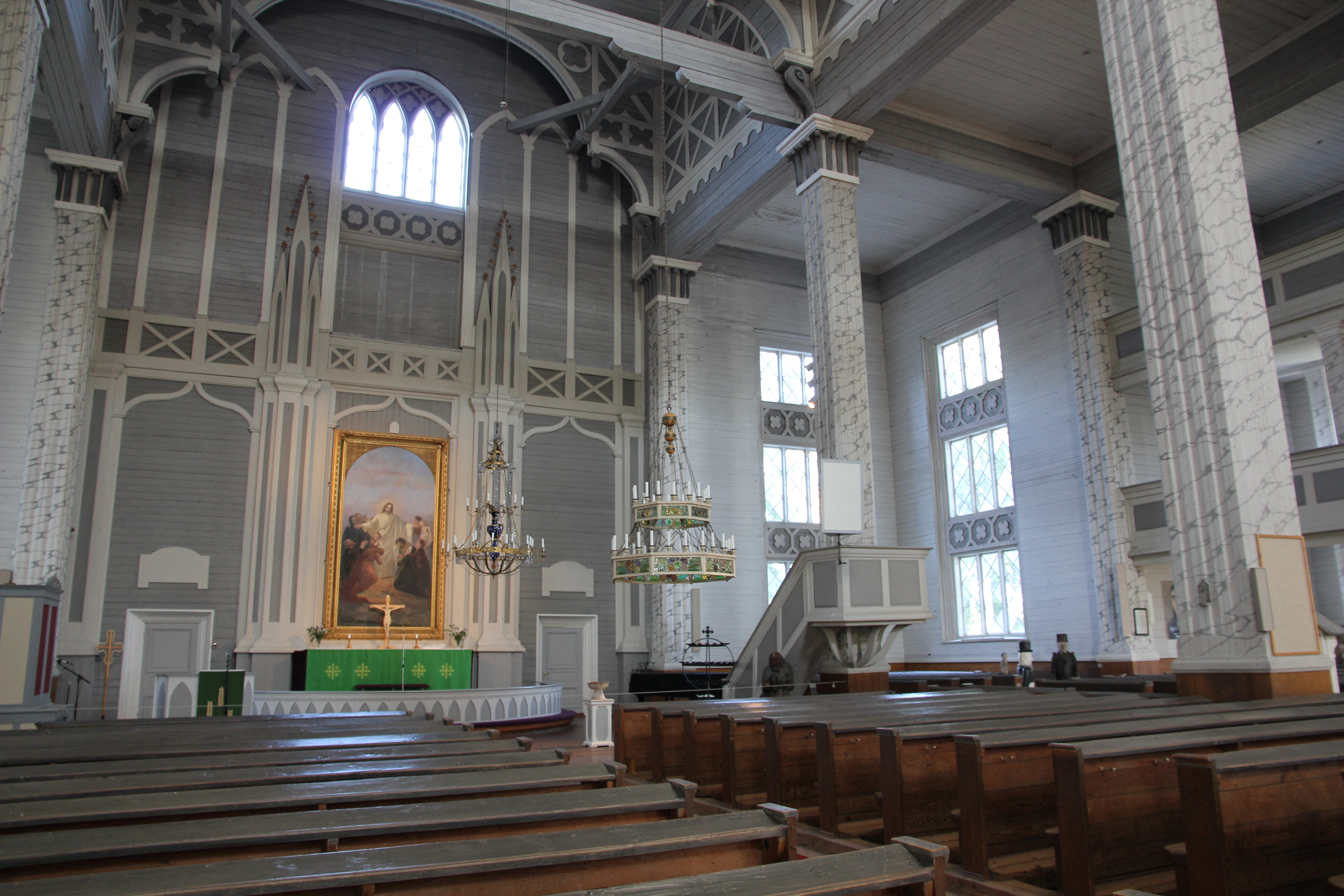
Inside the church

The Kerimäki Church (Finnish: Kerimäen kirkko, Swedish: Kerimäki kyrka) in Kerimäki, Finland, is the largest wooden church in the world. However, it is not the tallest; Săpânța-Peri Monastery church in Romania, at 78 metres (256 ft), Ascension Cathedral in Kazakhstan, at 56 metres (184 ft) meters, and St. George's Cathedral in Guyana, at 43.5 metres (143 ft), are taller.

== History ==
Designed by Anders Fredrik Granstedt (fi) and built between 1844 and 1847, the church has a length of 45 metres (148 ft), a width of 42 m (138 ft), a height of 37 m (121 ft) and a seating capacity of more than 3,000. Altogether, there can be 5,000 people at a time in the church.

It has been rumoured that the size of the church was the result of a miscalculation when it was built (supposedly the architect was working in centimetres, which the builder misunderstood to be inches, which are 2.54 times larger). Further studies, however, have shown that the church was actually intended to be as big as it is, so it could easily accommodate a half of the area's population at the same time.

During wintertime, services are held in a smaller "winter church" (built in 1953, re-modelled in 1997 ), since the main building has no heating.
