= Priests' Communion League =

Association of Roman Catholic priests

The Priests' Communion League is an association of Roman Catholic priests established at Rome on 20 July 1906. Its object is to spread the practice of frequent and daily Communion among the Catholic faithful in conformity with the Decree "Sacra Tridentina Synodus" of 20 December 1905.

It was raised by Pope Pius X to the dignity of an archconfraternity and was placed in the charge of the Fathers of the Blessed Sacrament.

The conditions for joining the league were:

1. To have one's name inscribed on the register of the league;
2. to pledge oneself (though under no obligation of conscience) to promote zealously the observance of the Decree upon frequent and daily Communion by the apostolate of prayer, of preaching, and of the press;
3. to subscribe for the monthly periodical Emmanuel, published by the Fathers of the Blessed Sacrament.
