= Recursive islands and lakes =

Island or lake that is itself within an island or lake

A recursive island or lake, also known as a nested island or lake, is an island that lies inside a lake, or vice versa. For the purposes of defining recursion, small continental land masses such as Madagascar and New Zealand count as islands, while large continental land masses such as Australia do not. Islands found within lakes in these countries are often recursive islands because the lake itself is located on an island. The recursion is sometimes expressed as the order of the island, so the many islands of the earth's global ocean are zero order islands.

== Recursive islands ==
=== Islands in lakes ===
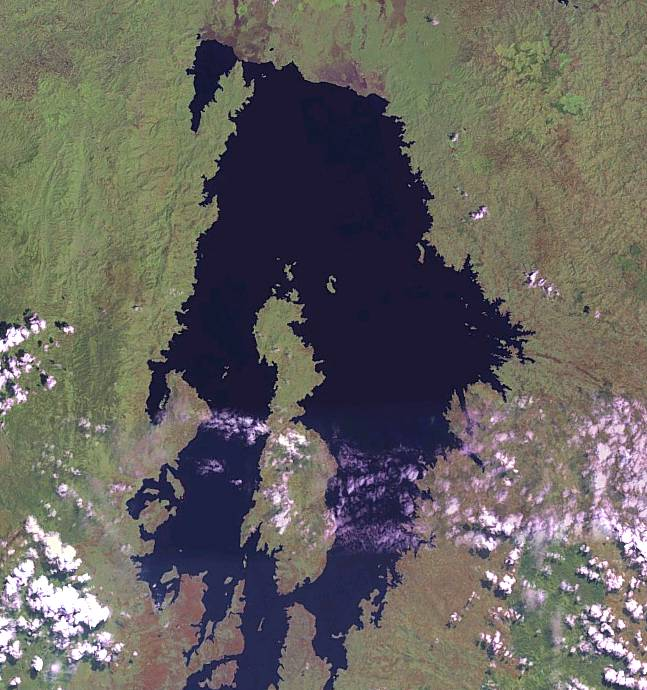
Idjwi, in the central-southern region of Lake Kivu in South Kivu Province, Democratic Republic of the Congo

Island	In lake	Country	Area (km^{2})	Coordinates	Notes
Manitoulin Island	Lake Michigan–Huron	Canada	2,766	45°39′8″N 82°06′32″W	Largest lake island in the world
René-Levasseur Island	Manicouagan Reservoir	Canada	2,020	51°23′50″N 68°41′30″W	The island is artificial as the lake it is in was made by flooding a smaller existing lake due to the creation of the Daniel-Johnson dam.
Soisalo	spread across several lakes	Finland	1,638	62°28′58″N 28°7′53″E	The largest island in continental Finland. It has shores to four different lakes (Kallavesi, Unnukka, Suvasvesi and Kermajärvi), but they are not all at the same level.
Sääminginsalo	Saimaa	Finland	1,090	61°58′58″N 29°4′53″E	Separated from one side by an artificial canal (Raikuu canal).
Olkhon Island	Lake Baikal	Russia	730	53°9′24″N 107°23′1″E	
Isle Royale	Lake Superior	United States	535	48°0′0″N 88°55′0″W	
Ukerewe Island	Lake Victoria	Tanzania	530	2°1′46″S 33°0′36″E	
St. Joseph Island	Lake Michigan–Huron	Canada	365	46°13′11″N 83°56′47″W	
Drummond Island	Lake Michigan–Huron	United States	347	46°0′0″N 83°40′0″W	
Idjwi	Lake Kivu	DR Congo	340	2°9′58″S 29°3′21″E	
Kotasaari	Kallavesi	Finland	285	62°52′52″N 28°0′23″E	Separated from one side by an artificial canal (Summa canal).
Ometepe	Lake Nicaragua	Nicaragua	276	11°30′0″N 85°35′0″W	Made of two conjoined volcanic islands
Big Island	Lake of the Woods	Canada	~200	61°07′45″N 116°45′24″W	
Zapatera	Lake Nicaragua	Nicaragua	54	11°43′48″N 85°49′12″W	
Mercer Island	Lake Washington	United States	33.4	47°34′39″N 122°12′43.2″W	Crossed by the Lacey V. Murrow Memorial Bridge, the second longest floating bridge in the world.
Wizard Island	Crater Lake	United States	1.3	42°56′19″N 122°08′44″W	Crater Lake itself is a caldera formed by the eruption of Mount Mazama; a series of smaller eruptions later formed cinder cones on the caldera floor, of which Wizard Island is the highest, and the only one now visible above the lake's surface.

=== Islands in lakes on islands ===
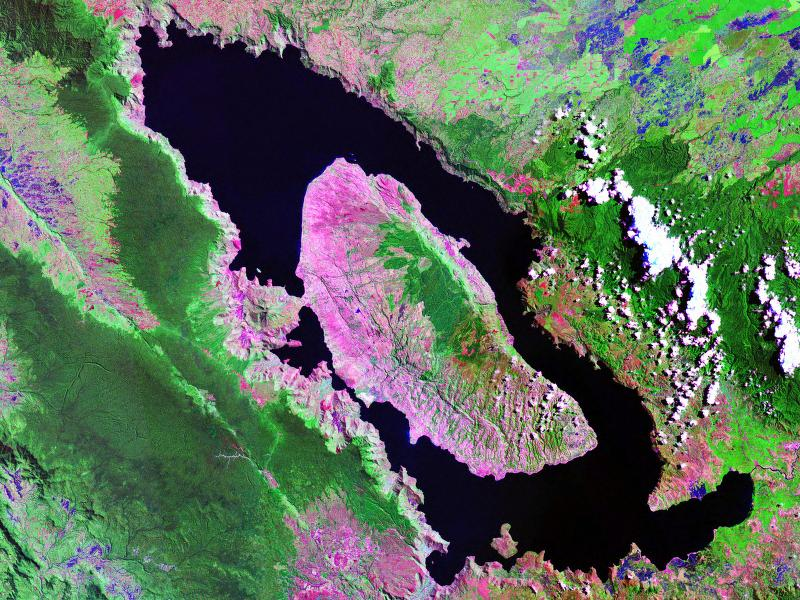
Samosir is in the middle of Lake Toba in North Sumatra, Indonesia

These are first order islands.

There are nearly 1,000 islands in lakes on islands in Finland alone.

Name	In lake	On island	Country	Area (km^{2})	Coordinates	Notes
Samosir	Lake Toba	Sumatra	Indonesia	630	2°35′0″N 98°49′0″E	Largest island in a lake on an island. Manmade from digging canal (Note: Was a peninsula until 1906 when a canal was dug, separating it from the mainland.)
Gatter Island	Lake Hazen	Ellesmere Island	Canada	0.2	81°55′5″N 69°05′35″W	
Glover Island	Grand Lake	Newfoundland	Canada	178	48°46′52″N 57°41′54″W	Largest naturally occurring island in a lake on an island.
Motutaiko Island	Lake Taupō	North Island	New Zealand	0.11	38°51′17″S 175°56′36″E	
Goodin Island	Lake Campbell	Fidalgo Island	United States	0.09	48°26′18.33″N 122°37′0.73″W	
Mokoia Island	Lake Rotorua	North Island	New Zealand	1.35	38°04′50″S 176°17′05″E	
Rahui Island	Lake Waikareiti	North Island	New Zealand		38°42′45″S 177°10′30″E	Largest of several islets in Lake Waikareiti
Mou Waho	Lake Wanaka	South Island	New Zealand	1.2	44°33′10″S 169°04′50″E	Largest of several islets in Lake Wanaka, including Stevensons Island
Pigeon Island	Lake Wakatipu	South Island	New Zealand	1.7	44°55′30″S 168°23′50″E	Largest of several islets in Lake Wakatipu, including Pig Island / Mātau and Hidden Island
Pomona Island	Lake Manapouri	South Island	New Zealand	2.6	45°30′30″S 167°28′30″E	Largest of several islets in Lake Manapouri; largest lake island in New Zealand
Motmot Island	Lake Wisdom	Long Island	Papua New Guinea	0.04	5°21′8″S 147°7′2″E	
—	West Lake	Brownsea Island	United Kingdom	0.0008	50°41′34″N 1°58′21″W	
—	—	Great Britain	United Kingdom	0.0000039576	51.896052°N 0.909800°E	On south bank of River Colne. Exists on maps surrounded a lake on all sides with only a makeshift wooden bridge to access the island.
Belle Isle	Windermere	Great Britain	United Kingdom	0.17	54°21′43″N 2°56′4″W	
Storgrynnan	Vandöfjärden	Fasta Åland	Finland	0.12	60°17′46″N 19°55′12″E	
—	Senanayaka Samudra	Sri Lanka	Sri Lanka	0.02	7°12′0″N 81°31′10″E	
Derrywarragh Island	Lough Neagh	Ireland	United Kingdom	0.56	54°30′57″N 6°34′11″W	
Boa Island	Lower Lough Erne	Ireland	United Kingdom	5.3	54.5241°N 7.79921°W	Largest lake island of the United Kingdom and inland island of Ireland
—	Loch Finlaggan	Islay	United Kingdom	0.0003	55°49′41.76″N 6°10′27″W	
—	Loch Finlaggan	Islay	United Kingdom	0.0008	55°50′3.86″N 6°10′24.60″W	
Council Isle	Loch Finlaggan	Islay	United Kingdom	0.01	55°50′7.66″N 6°10′20.78″W	
Sveta Marija	Veliko jezero	Mljet	Croatia	0.017	42°46′8″N 17°21′37″E	
Chikubu Island	Lake Biwa	Honshu	Japan	0.14	35°25′20″N 136°8′37″E	
Takeshima	Lake Biwa	Honshu	Japan	0.6	35°17′47″N 136°10′41″E	
Okishima	Lake Biwa	Honshu	Japan	1.51	35°12′28″N 136°3′58″E	Largest of the three islands located within Lake Biwa, which is Japan's largest lake.
Nakajima (Lake Kussharo)	Lake Kussharo	Hokkaido	Japan	5.81	43°37′56″N 144°18′20″E	Largest recursive island in Japan
Nakajima (Lake Toya)	Lake Tōya	Hokkaido	Japan	4.84	42°36′07″N 140°51′11″E	
Okinajima	Lake Inawashiro	Honshu	Japan	0.07	37°30′33″N 140°02′15″E	
Loeha Island	Lake Towuti	Sulawesi	Indonesia	12.5	2°46′22″S 121°32′51″E	
Lalu Island	Sun Moon Lake	Nantou	Taiwan	0.882	23°51′20″N 120°54′40″E	
Yufei Island	Qingcao Lake	Hsinchu	Taiwan	0.00425	24°46′29″N 120°58′18″E	
—	Kasegalik Lake	Flaherty Island	Canada			There are several other islands in that lake.
Isla Cabritos	Lago Enriquillo	Hispaniola	Dominican Republic	16.67	18°29′21″N 71°40′55″W	
—	—	Cat Ba Island	Vietnam	0.0005	20°46′54″N 107°5′30″E	There is a smaller island, to the south of it.
—	Blöndulón	Iceland	Iceland			There are nine other islands in this lake, all significantly smaller than this one.

=== Islands in lakes on islands in lakes ===
These are second order islands.

Name	In lake	On island	In lake	Country	Area (km^{2})	Coordinates	Notes
Kokkosaari	Kokkohauta	Sääminginsalo	Saimaa	Finland	0.88	61°59′20″N 29°12′55″E	Claimed to be the world's largest island in a lake on an island in a lake. Another island, Suursaari (62°5′28″N 28°59′28″E) in Hanhijärvi, is also located in Sääminginsalo, and is about half the size of Kokkosaari. Separated by an artificial canal, Sääminginsalo might not be considered an island.
—	Lake Chaunoy (Lac du Chaunoy)	René-Levasseur Island	Manicouagan Reservoir	Canada	0.44	51°33′5″N 68°49′8″W	René-Levasseur Island is an artificial island, formed when the Manicouagan reservoir was flooded in 1970. There are also more than 10 other smaller islands in Lake Chaunoy, the largest of which is less than a tenth of the size of the one listed here.
Treasure Island	Lake Mindemoya	Manitoulin Island	Lake Michigan–Huron	Canada	0.4	45°45′50″N 82°10′41″W	Largest natural island on a lake on an island on a lake.
Kakawaie Island	Lake Kagawong	Manitoulin Island	Lake Michigan–Huron	Canada	0.24	45°48′45″N 82°18′22″W	
Allan Island	Ice Lake, Ontario	Manitoulin Island	Lake Michigan–Huron	Canada	0.024	45° 53′ 23″ N, 82° 23′ 10″ W	The smaller of two islands on Ice Lake, on Manitoulin Island, on Lake Michigan
Ryan Island	Siskiwit Lake	Isle Royale	Lake Superior	United States	0.141	48°0′36″N 88°46′15″W	Largest island in the largest lake on the largest island in the largest lake in the world (Lake Superior)
—	Second Lake	Drummond Island	Lake Michigan–Huron	United States	0.044	46°03′2″N 83°35′55″W	
—	Mackaysee Lake	Chambers Island	Green Bay, Lake Michigan	United States	0.009	45°11′41″N 87°20′43″W	
—	Frith Lake	Kelvin Island	Lake Nipigon	Canada	0.0013	49°52′29″N 88°40′53″W	
Piiroonsaari	Saravesi	Kotasaari	Kallavesi	Finland	0.22	62°50′41″N 28°4′36″E	Separated by an artificial canal, Kotasaari might not be considered an island.
Suurisaari	Oininki	Äitsaari	Saimaa	Finland	0.14	61°18′57″N 28°38′1″E|	
Ukonsaari	Kulkemus	Partalansaari	Pihlajavesi (Saimaa)	Finland	0.12	61°40′9″N 28°23′43″E	
—	Lake Cancy	René-Levasseur Island	Manicouagan Reservoir	Canada	0.011	51°33′21″N 68°50′52″W	
—	Lac des Pigamons	Îlots Walcott	Lake Mistassini	Canada	0.0002	51°07′18″N 73°21′34″W	
—	—	Wilson Island	Great Slave Lake	Canada	0.011	61°50′7″N 112°46′57″W	
Raaskasaari	Kylliönjärvi	Viljakansaari	Pihlajavesi (Saimaa)	Finland	0.05	61°33′53″N 28°22′56″E	
—	—	Kållandsö	Vänern	Sweden	0.0027	58°41′52″N 13°11′18″E	There is a second island in the lake, almost the exact same size
Ösjöholmen	Ösjön	Ammerön	Revsundssjön	Sweden	0.008	62°51′57″N 15°10′23″E	
—	—	Tynnelsö	Mälaren	Sweden	0.0005	59°25′1″N 17°04′44″E	
—	—	—	Lake Kovdozero	Russia	0.0162	66°45′23″N 31°58′37″E	
—	—	Shaganappie Island	Wollaston Lake	Canada	0.0066	58°22′22″N 102°57′51″W	
—	Calder Lake	Malcolm Island	Reindeer Lake	Canada	0.0154	56°58′24″N 102°8′1″W	
—	—	Ispatinow Island	Cree Lake	Canada	0.00019	57°27′40″N 106°40′47″W	
—	—	Blanchet Island	Great Slave Lake	Canada	0.01	61°59′40″N 112°30′56″W	Several small islands in this lake
—	Vanooyen Lake	Shakespeare Island	Lake Nipigon	Canada	0.0182	49°39′36″N 88°24′10″W	There is a second, smaller island in this lake.
—	Margaret Lake	Elk Island	God's Lake	Canada	0.00095	54°39′32″N 94°10′44″W	Several small islands in this lake
–	Margaret Lake	Elk Island	God's Lake	Canada	~0.0006	54°39′29″N 94°10′37″W	Several small islands in this lake
–	Margaret Lake	Elk Island	God's Lake	Canada	~0.0002	54°39′29″N 94°10′34″W	Several small islands in this lake
–	Margaret Lake	Elk Island	God's Lake	Canada	~0.00015	54°39′29″N 94°10′33″W	Several small islands in this lake
–	Margaret Lake	Elk Island	God's Lake	Canada	~0.00002–5	54°39′29″N 94°10′39″W	Several small islands in this lake
–	Margaret Lake	Elk Island	God's Lake	Canada	~0.00004–10	54°39′26″N 94°10′44″W	Several small islands in this lake
–	Margaret Lake	Elk Island	God's Lake	Canada	~0.000015-50	54°39′27″N 94°10′31″W	Several small islands in this lake
–	Margaret Lake	Elk Island	God's Lake	Canada	~0.000005-20	54°39′32″N 94°10′25″W	Several small islands in this lake
–	Margaret Lake	Elk Island	God's Lake	Canada	~0.000005–20	54°39′36″N 94°10′36″W	Several small islands in this lake
–	Margaret Lake	Elk Island	God's Lake	Canada	~0.000005-20	54°39′43″N 94°11′03″W	Several small islands in this lake
–	Margaret Lake	Elk Island	God's Lake	Canada	~0.000005–20	54°39′42″N 94°11′05″W	Several small islands in this lake
–	Margaret Lake	Elk Island	God's Lake	Canada	~0.000001–5	54°39′43″N 94°10′57″W	Several small islands in this lake
—	—	Ile Guillaume Couture	Lac Mistassini	Canada	0.0017	50°55′1″N 73°37′32″W	
—	—	Ile Tchapahipane	Lac Mistassini	Canada	0.00125	51°4′34″N 73°25′25″W	
—	—	Pie Island	Lac Mistassini	Canada	0.0086	48°13′58″N 89°3′26″W	Two islands of similar size are in this lake
—	Muir Lake	St Ignace Island	Lake Superior	Canada	0.00325	48°48′28″N 88°2′3″W	
—	Antler Lake	St Ignace Island	Lake Superior	Canada	0.0041	48°48′59″N 88°0′5″W	Two islands of similar size are in this lake
—	Williamson Lake	St Ignace Island	Lake Superior	Canada	0.00425	48°48′4″N 88°1′39″W	
—	Molinski Lake	Simpson Island	Lake Superior	Canada	0.01	48°49′13″N 87°42′51″W	
—	Caribou Lake	Simpson Island	Lake Superior	Canada	0.00465	48°45′51″N 87°39′33″W	
—	Veronica Lake	Slate Islands	Lake Superior	Canada	0.0065	48°39′28″N 86°59′23″W	
—	Michi Lake	Michipicoten Island	Lake Superior	Canada	0.0037	47°44′28″N 85°54′29″W	There are three islands in total in this lake
—	Channel Lake	Michipicoten Island	Lake Superior	Canada	0.0084	47°43′50″N 85°48′0″W	A second, smaller island is immediately to the west of this one.
—	—	—	Knielinger See	Germany	0.0003	49°01′52.5″N 8°18′34.3″E	
—	—	Wizard Island	Crater Lake	United States			
—	Lac Civic	Île Bronson	Réservoir Cabonga	Canada			There are other islands in lakes on islands in Cabonga.
–	–	–	Dubawnt Lake	Canada		63°15′36″N 101°08′08″W	Viewable on Google Earth only. As of 10 July 2024 (according to Google Earth data), the island did not collide with its island.
–	–	Xishan Island	Lake Tai	China		31°8′31.25″N 120°20′30.17″E	Two small islands. The unnamed lake and other two surrounding lakes are collectively called 无机坑 (wújīkēng), and is the site of a former quarry.

=== Islands in lakes on islands in lakes on islands ===
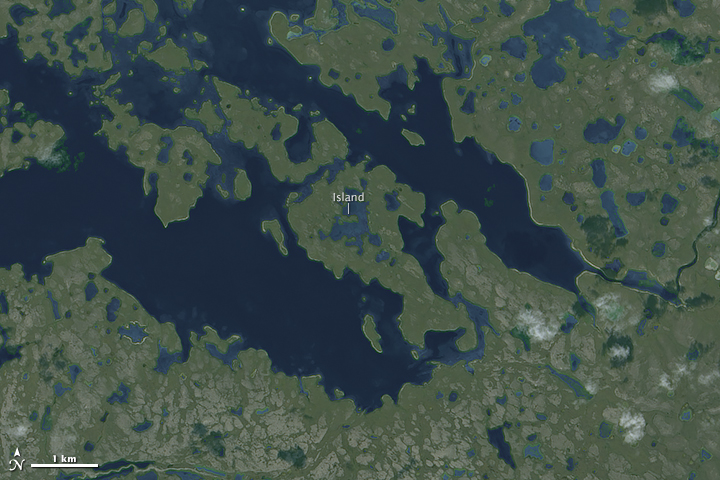
Nameless isle within Victoria Island in Nunavut Territory, Canada

These are third order islands.

Name	In lake	On island	In lake	On island	Country	Area (m^{2})	Coordinates	Notes
—	—	—	Nettilling Lake	Baffin Island	Canada	40,000	66°41′15″N 70°28′48″W	There are more islands in lakes on the "level 2" island in Nettling Lake.
—	—	—	—	Victoria Island	Canada	16,000	69°47′32″N 108°14′26″W	Sometimes unofficially referred to as "Inception Island", as it is a third-order island within an island.
—	Aek Natonang (locally Sidihoni Lake)	Samosir	Lake Toba	Sumatra	Indonesia	13,125	2°33′52″N 98°53′0″E	Two islands, the largest of which is 175 m by 75 m.
—	—	—	—	King William Island	Canada	12,000	69°27′39″N 97°35′43″W	One circular island, which is around 120m in diameter
—	—	Glover Island	Grand Lake	Newfoundland	Canada	7,500	48°47′48″N 57°39′28″W	There are several (at least seven) other, even smaller, islets in the lake
—	—	—	—	Baffin Island	Canada	3,000	64°47′32″N 75°25′11″W	One circular island, which is around 60m in diameter
—	—	Glover Island	Grand Lake	Newfoundland	Canada	2,300	48°43′8″N 57°46′23″W	In a lake 11 km south west to the lake that contains the larger island. There are no other island in this island's lake
—	—	—	Meelpaeg Reservoir	Newfoundland	Canada	100	48°18′44″N 56°30′48″W	There are 3 other smaller islands in the same lake.
—	Arethusa Pool	Mou Waho	Lake Wānaka	South Island	New Zealand	225	44°33′15″S 169°05′3″E	There are two islands in this lake, both less than 25 m across.
—	—	Eilean Sùbhainn	Loch Maree	Great Britain	United Kingdom	225	57°41′24″N 5°29′9″W	Two islets, each of which is 15m by 15m
—	—	—	Kooryet Lake	Banks Island (British Columbia)	Canada	~100	53°21′7″N 129°59′30″W	A number of small islets, the largest of which is only 10m across
—	—	Samosir	Lake Toba	Sumatra	Indonesia	400	2°38′11″N 98°50′14″E	
—	—	Ostrov Litvinova	Ozero Nevskoye	Sakhalin	Russia	50	49°19′17″N 143°37′30″E	There is (at least) one smaller island in the same lake
—	—	—	Jubilee Lake	Newfoundland	Canada	20	48°3′50″N 55°10′24″W	Several small islets, the largest of which is about 5 m across
—	—	Cayo pajaro	Laguna de Leche	Cuba	Cuba	832	22°13′31″N 78°40′2″W	There are several other islets in the lake, all about half the area of the specified islet.
Vulcan Point	Main Crater Lake	Volcano Island	Lake Taal	Luzon	Philippines	1.2	14°00′35″N 120°59′54″E	
—	—	—	Hatchet Lake	Adak Island	United States		51°43′49.1″N 176°45′31.2″W	
—	—	—	—	Victoria Island	Canada	944	71°42′16.8″N 115°25′41.4″W	

=== Islands in lakes on islands in lakes on islands in lakes ===
This is a fourth order island.

Name	In lake	On island	In lake	On island	In lake	Country	Size (km^{2})	Coordinates	Notes
—	—	—	—	—	Lake Yathkyed	Canada	—	62°39′05″N 97°47′15″W	

== Recursive lakes ==
=== Lakes on islands ===
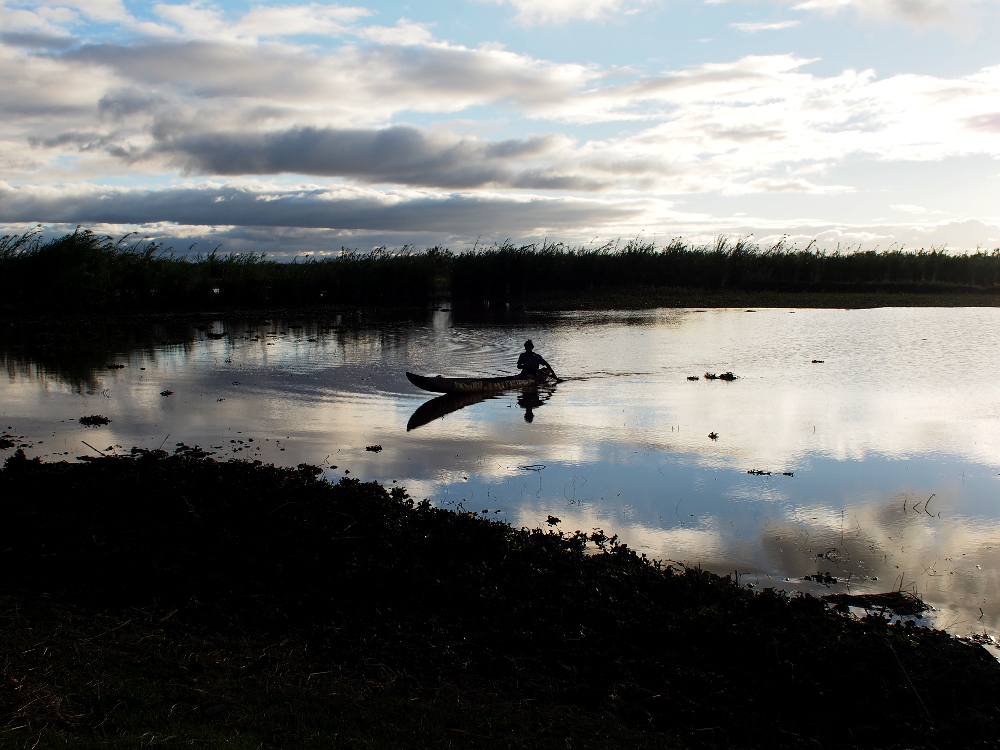
Lake Alaotra region, Madagascar

Name	On island	Country	Size (km^{2})	Coordinates	Notes
Nettilling Lake	Baffin Island	Canada	5,542	66°29′N 70°20′W	
Lake Alaotra	Madagascar	Madagascar	900	17.5°S 48.5°E	
Laguna de Leche	Cuba	Cuba	67.2	22°12′33″N 78°37′17″W	
Lough Neagh	Island of Ireland	Northern Ireland/United Kingdom	392	54°37′06″N 6°23′43″W	
Lough Corrib	Island of Ireland	Republic of Ireland	176	53°26′N 9°14′W	
Loch Lomond	Great Britain	Scotland/United Kingdom	71	56°05′N 4°34′W	
Lake Kawaguchi	Honshu	Japan	6.13	35°30′56″N 138°45′36″E	The largest among the Fuji Five Lakes
Þingvallavatn	Iceland	Iceland	84	64°11′N 21°09′W	
Lake Taupō	North Island	New Zealand	616	38°48′25″S 175°54′28″E	
Lake Wakatipu	South Island	New Zealand	289	45°03′S 168°30′E	
Lake Biwa	Honshu	Japan	670	35°20′N 136°10′E	Largest lake in Japan
Lake Toba	Sumatra	Indonesia	1130	2°40′48″N 98°52′48″W	
Lake Ranau	Sumatra	Indonesia	126	4°51′45″S 103°55′50″E	
Lake Singkarak	Sumatra	Indonesia	108	0°37′12″S 100°32′24″E	
Lake Towuti	Sulawesi	Indonesia	561	2°45′0″S 121°30′0″E	
Lake Poso	Sulawesi	Indonesia	323	1°55′28″S 120°37′0″E	
Lake Matano	Sulawesi	Indonesia	164	2°29′7″S 121°20′0″E	

=== Lakes on islands in lakes ===
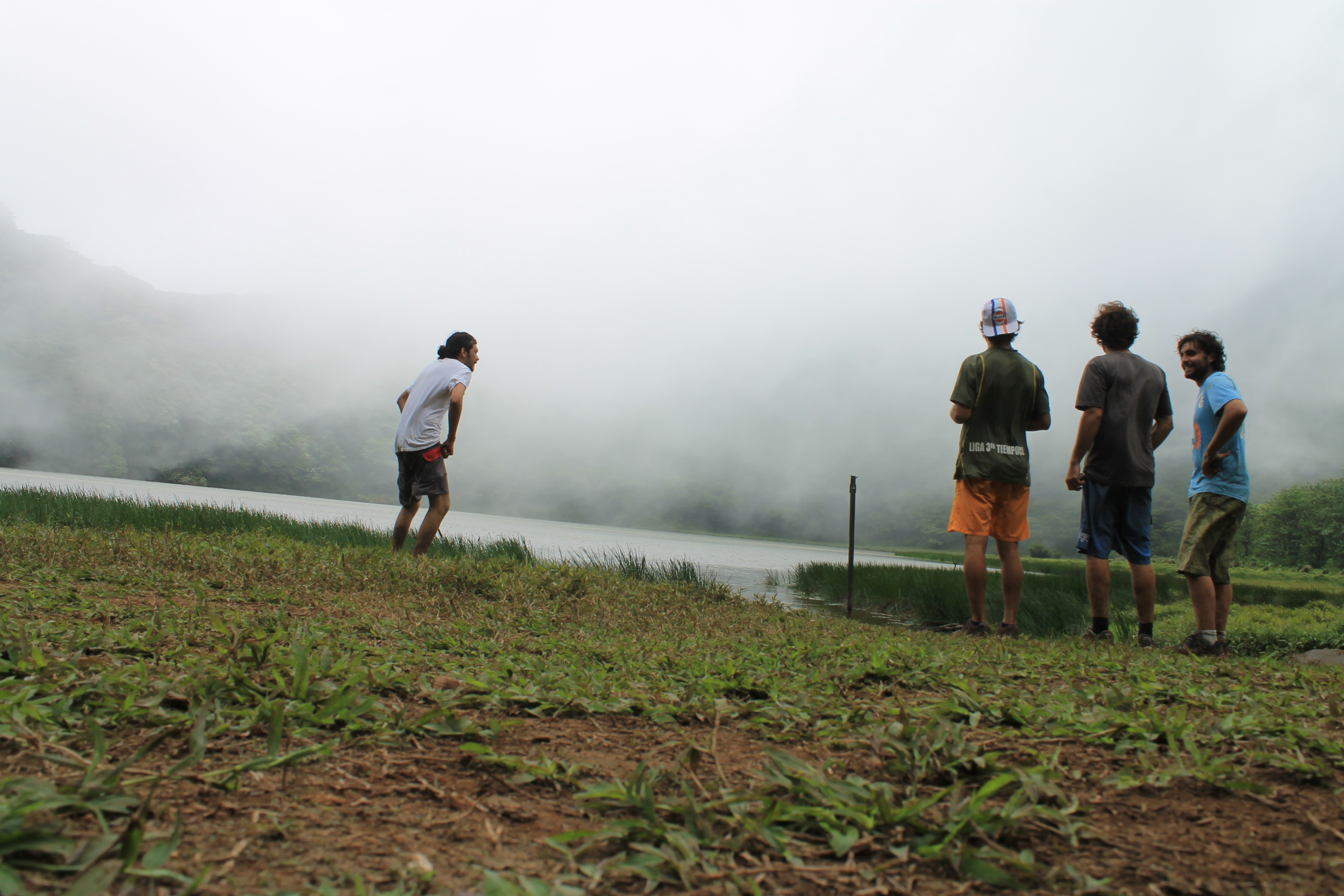
Tourists on Laguna del Volcan Maderas on Ometepe Island in Lake Nicaragua

These are first order lakes.

Name	On island	In lake	Country	Size (km^{2})	Coordinates	Notes
Lake Manitou	Manitoulin Island	Lake Michigan–Huron	Canada	106	45°46′42″N 81°59′30″W	
Lac Observation	René-Levasseur Island	Manicouagan Reservoir	Canada	13.5	51°21′42″N 68°49′12″W	
Ylä-Enonvesi	Sääminginsalo	Saimaa	Finland	12	62°3′7″N 29°0′12″E	Includes Lake Saarijärvi that forms its southern part. Separated by an artificial canal, Sääminginsalo might not be considered an island.
Kulkemus	Partalansaari	Pihlajavesi (Saimaa)	Finland	5.8	61°40′43″N 28°24′13″E	
Saajuu-Palovesi	Partalansaari	Pihlajavesi (Saimaa)	Finland	4.1	61°41′55″N 28°19′34″E	
Saravesi	Kotasaari	Kallavesi	Finland	4.1	62°50′49″N 28°4′52″E	Separated by an artificial canal, Kotasaari might not be considered an island.
Oininki	Äitsaari	Saimaa	Finland	2.6	61°18′52″N 28°38′21″E	
Malosenjärvi	Viljakansaari	Pihlajavesi (Saimaa)	Finland	1.4	61°31′58″N 28°16′11″E	
Valkiajärvi	Hurissalo	Saimaa	Finland	1.4	61°30′27″N 27°49′29″E	
Ruokojärvi	Partalansaari	Pihlajavesi (Saimaa)	Finland	1.3	61°38′1″N 28°23′39″E	
Närtejärvi	Viljakansaari	Pihlajavesi (Saimaa)	Finland	1.2	61°34′31″N 28°31′8″E	
Kylliönjärvi	Viljakansaari	Pihlajavesi (Saimaa)	Finland	1.1	61°33′47″N 28°22′59″E	
Lapinjärvi	Hurissalo	Saimaa	Finland	1.1	61°29′33″N 27°48′30″E	
Shara-Nur	Olkhon Island	Lake Baikal	Russia	0.75	53°06′18″N 107°15′16″E	
Siskiwit Lake	Isle Royale	Lake Superior	United States	16.8	48°00′05″N 088°47′50″W	
Lake Desor	Isle Royale	Lake Superior	United States	4.3	47°58′36″N 88°59′13″W	
Lake Richie	Isle Royale	Lake Superior	United States	2.162	48°2′38″N 88°41′43″W	
Lake Mindemoya	Manitoulin Island	Lake Michigan–Huron	Canada	38.7	45°45′43″N 82°12′32″W	
Lake Kagawong	Manitoulin Island	Lake Michigan–Huron	Canada	55.6	45°50′0″N 82°18′36″W	
Little Lake	Washington Island	Lake Michigan	United States	0.17	45°24′36″N 86°56′29″W	
Lake Windigo	Star Island	Cass Lake (Minnesota)	United States	0.8	47°25′7″N 94°34′13″W	
Fox Lagoon	Pelee island	Lake Erie	Canada	0.02	41°43′57″N 82°40′18″W	
Lake Henry	Pelee island	Lake Erie	Canada	0.345	41°49′32″N 82°38′20″W	
Laguna del Volcan Maderas	Ometepe	Lake Nicaragua	Nicaragua	0.034	11°26′42″N 85°30′38″W	
Laguna de Zapatera	Zapatera	Lake Nicaragua	Nicaragua	0.19	11°45′59″N 85°51′25″W	
Antoniyevskoye Lake	Valaam	Lake Ladoga	Russia	0.028	61°23′18″N 30°59′48″E	
Ozero Leshchevo	Valaam	Lake Ladoga	Russia	0.27	61°21′35″N 30°55′58″E	
Lake Geneserath	Beaver Island	Lake Michigan–Huron	United States	2	45°35′55″N 85°32′23″W	
Ösjön	Ammerön	Revsundssjön	Sweden	0.58	62°51′53″N 15°10′21″E	
Igelviken	Färingsö	Mälaren	Sweden	0.47	59°21′53″N 17°42′13″E	
Ändsjön	Frösön	Storsjön	Sweden	0.32	63°10′34″N 14°34′24″E	
Gråtjønna	Røssvassholmen	Røssvatnet	Norway	0.05	65°41′46″N 13°59′47″E	
—	—	Lake Chad	Cameroon			There is another, smaller lake on that island. There are a few more islands in Lake Chad that have a lake on them.
Süvähaud	Piirissaar	Peipus	Estonia			
—	—	Thac Ba Reservoir	Vietnam	0.05	21°50'24.7"N 104°58'02.5"E	There are some extremely tiny islets in that lake.

=== Lakes on islands in lakes on islands ===
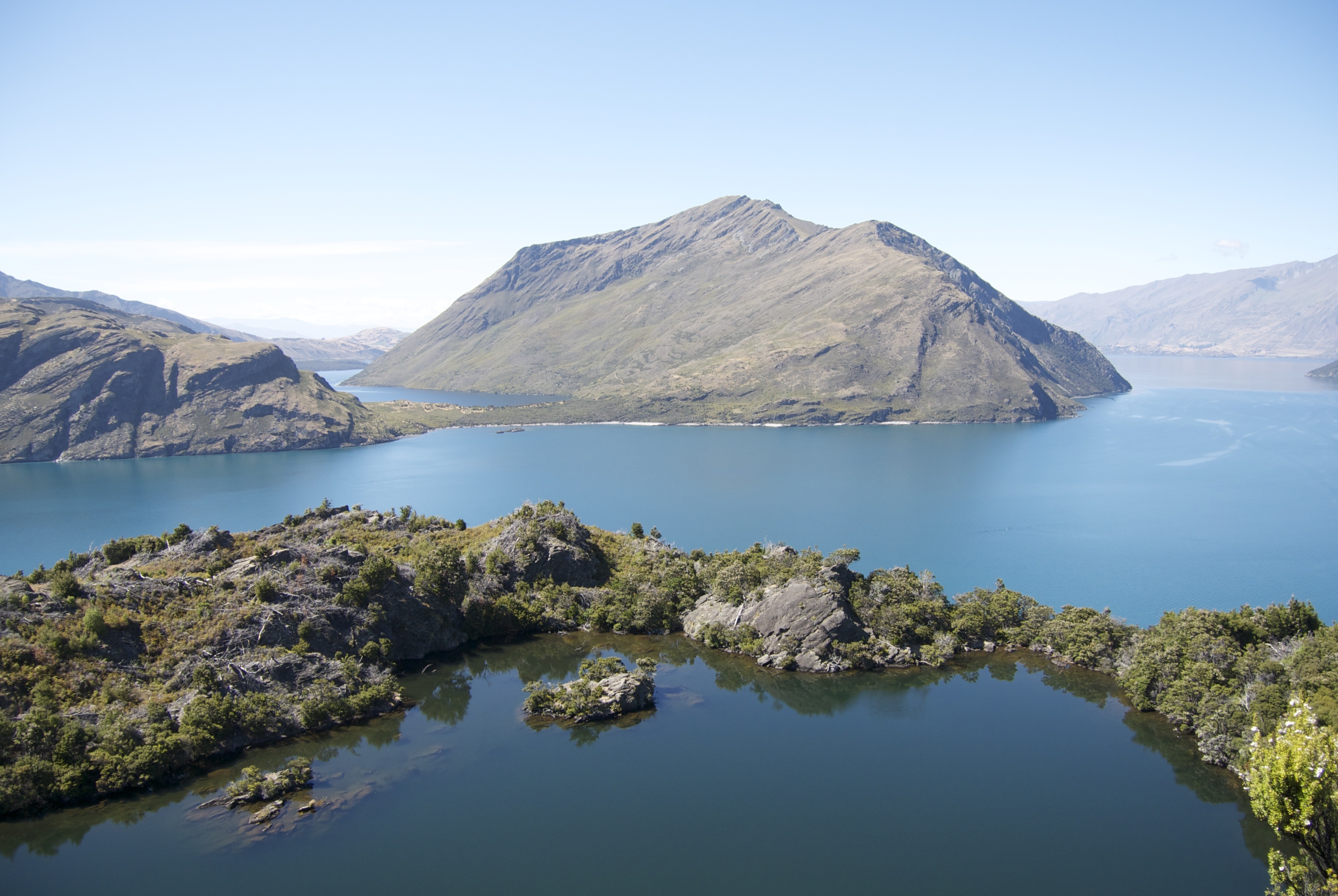
View across Arethusa Pool (foreground) on Mou Waho Island to Lake Wānaka, New Zealand

These are second order lakes.

Name	On island	In lake	On island	Country	Size (km^{2})	Coordinates	Notes
—	—	Nettilling Lake	Baffin Island	Canada	1.55	66°23′15″N 69°38′41″W	
—	Glover Island	Grand Lake	Newfoundland	Canada	1.40	48°48′9″N 57°39′41″W	
Arethusa Pool	Mou Waho	Lake Wānaka	South Island	New Zealand	0.05	44°33′15″S 169°05′00″E	
—	Rahui Island	Lake Waikareiti	North Island	New Zealand	0.003	38°42′45″S 177°10′22″E	
—	—	Jubilee Lake	Newfoundland	Canada	0.025	48°3′50″N 55°10′24″W	
—	—	Mölnorträsk	Fårö	Sweden	0.00006	57°55′45″N 19°08′29″E	Extremely small
—	—	—	Baffin Island	Canada		70°41′14″N 80°34′18″W	
Molemole	Motu'a'ali	Motu Si'i	Niuafo'ou	Tonga	0.02	15.594888°S 175.649157°W	
—	Sandey	Þingvallavatn	Iceland	Iceland			
—	Gatter Lake	Lake Hazen	Ellesmere Island	Canada			Northernmost lake of its kind in the world.
—	Teinholmen	Vestrevatnet	Osterøy	Norway		60.536628°N 5.627209°E	

=== Lakes on islands in lakes on islands in lakes ===
There are third order lakes.

Name	On island	In lake	On island	In lake	Country	Size (km^{2})	Coordinates	Notes
—	—	—	—	Lake Yathkyed	Canada	0.013	62°39′5.8″N 97°47′11.8″W	This lake itself contains an island, the most recursive island to have been discovered in the world.

== See also ==
- List of endorheic basins
- Volcanic crater lake
- List of islands by area
- List of lakes by area
- List of islands by population
