= Sääminginsalo =

Island in Finland

Coordinates: 62°N 29°E

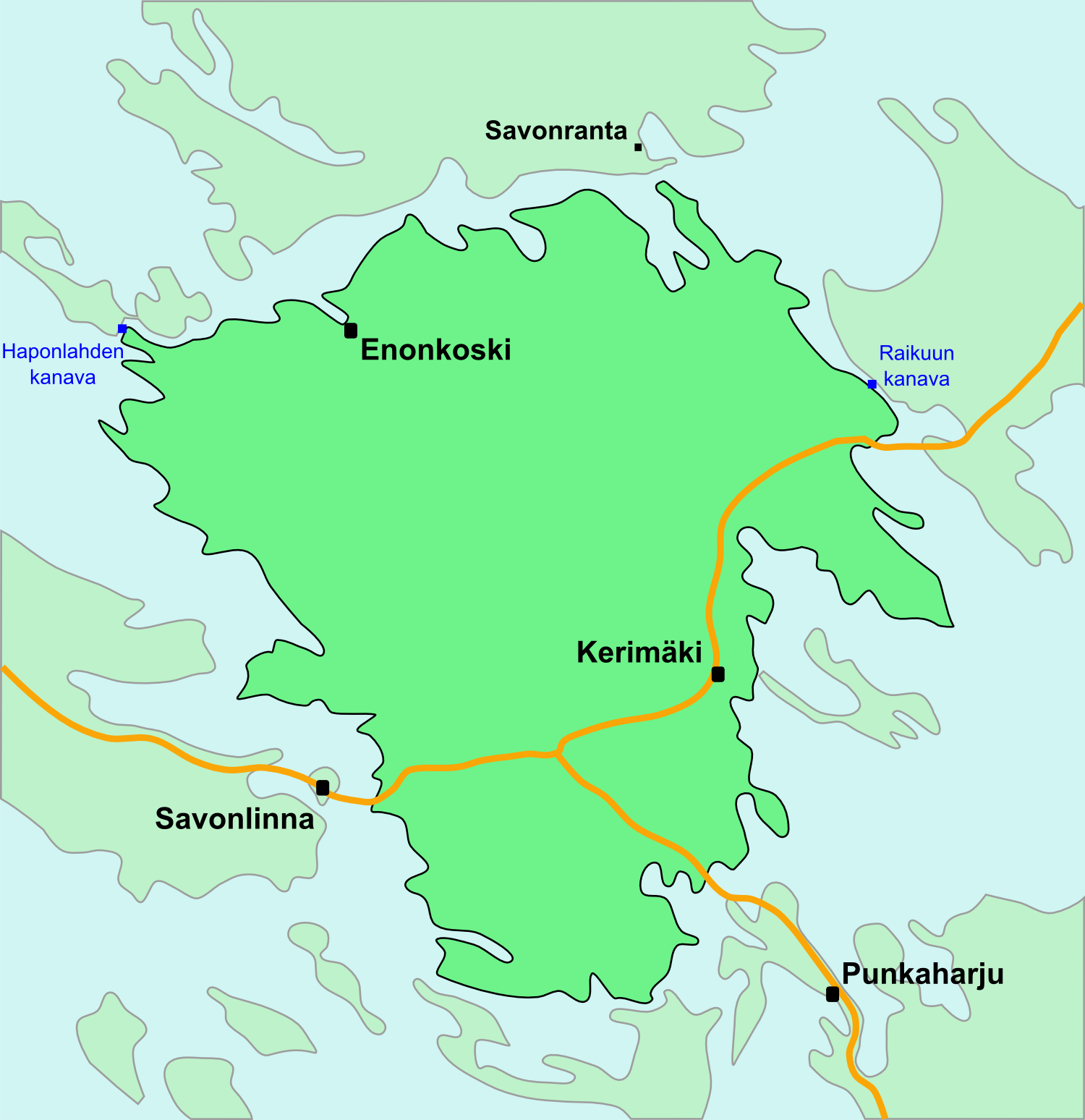
Map of Sääminginsalo

Sääminginsalo has been said to be the largest true island of Finland (area 1,069 km^{2} or 413 sq mi). If it is considered an island, it is the third-largest lake island in the world. It is located in the Southern Savonia region of Eastern Finland and is surrounded by the Greater Saimaa lake (Haukivesi, Puruvesi and Pihlajavesi) and an artificial canal, Raikuun kanava, which was built in 1750s. The most famous sight on Sääminginsalo is the Kerimäki Church, the largest wooden church in the world.

Traditionally, Soisalo in the same lake complex has been considered the largest island of Finland, but it is technically not a true island because the lakes surrounding it are not on the same level. The same, however, can be said of Sääminginsalo, as it is detached from the mainland only by an artificial canal and, in this respect, does not differ in any way from peninsulas like Jutland or the Peloponnese.

== See also ==
- List of lake islands
