= List of lakes by area =

Dymaxion world map with the 15 largest lakes roughly to scale

Following are two lists of terrestrial lakes that have surface areas of more than approximately 673,000 square kilometres (1,200 mi^{2}), ranked by area, excluding reservoirs and lagoons.

The area of some lakes can vary over time, either seasonally or from year to year. This is especially true of salt lakes in arid climates. This list therefore excludes seasonal lakes such as Kati Thanda–Lake Eyre (maximum area 9,500 km^{2}, 3,700 sq mi), Mar Chiquita Lake (Córdoba) (maximum area 6,000 km^{2}, 2,300 sq mi), Chott el Djerid (up to 7,000 km^{2}, 2,700 sq mi), Lake Torrens (maximum area 5,745 km^{2}, 2,218 sq mi) and Great Salt Lake (maximum area, 1988, 8,500 km^{2}, 3,300 sq mi).

The list is divided in two: all lakes as conventionally defined down to 3,000 square kilometres (1,200 mi^{2}), and the largest lakes under a geological definition, where the Caspian Sea is considered a small ocean rather than a lake, and Lake Michigan–Huron (or "Huron–Michigan") is recognized as a single body of water. The Caspian Sea is conventionally considered the world's largest lake, but it is centered on an oceanic basin (a fragment of the ancient Tethys Ocean) rather than lying entirely over continental crust as all other lakes do. Lake Michigan and Lake Huron are conventionally counted as separate lakes, but hydrologically they are a single body of water, which is the world's largest lake by surface area.

== Conventional list ==
Following are conventionally identified lakes larger than 3,000 km^{2} (1,200 sq mi) in area.

Continent colour key
Africa	Antarctica	Asia	Eurasia	Europe	North America	South America

Thumbnail, at fixed scale		Name	Countries with shoreline	Type	Area	Length	Max. depth	Volume	Notes
	1	Caspian Sea	Iran; Kazakhstan; Turkmenistan; Azerbaijan; Russia	Saline 1.2%	389,000 km^{2} 150,000 sq mi	1,199 km 745 mi	1,025 m 3,363 ft	78,200 km^{3} 18,800 cu mi	Geologically a small ocean rather than a lake. Garabogazköl lagoon, if counted separately, would rank as the world's 15th largest, with an area of 18,000 square kilometres (6,900 mi^{2}).
	2	Superior	Canada; United States	Fresh	82,100 km^{2} 31,700 sq mi	616 km 383 mi	406 m 1,332 ft	12,070 km^{3} 2,900 cu mi	Largest of the Great Lakes by volume, having more water than the other four combined.
	3	Victoria	Tanzania; Uganda; Kenya	Fresh	59,940 km^{2} 23,140 sq mi	322 km 200 mi	81 m 266 ft	2,420 km^{3} 580 cu mi	The largest lake by area in Africa.
	4	Huron	Canada; United States	Fresh	59,570 km^{2} 23,000 sq mi	332 km 206 mi	229 m 751 ft	3,520 km^{3} 840 cu mi	The larger lobe of Lake Michigan–Huron. Contains Manitoulin Island, the world's largest lake island.
	5	Michigan	United States	Fresh	57,800 km^{2} 22,300 sq mi	494 km 307 mi	282 m 925 ft	4,930 km^{3} 1,180 cu mi	The smaller lobe of Lake Michigan–Huron. The largest lake (by area) that is located entirely in one country.
	6	Tanganyika	Tanzania; Democratic Republic of the Congo; Burundi; Zambia	Fresh	32,900 km^{2} 12,700 sq mi	676 km 420 mi	1,470 m 4,820 ft	18,750 km^{3} 4,500 cu mi	Longest freshwater lake in the world and third largest of any kind by volume.
	7	Baikal	Russia	Fresh	31,722 km^{2} 12,248 sq mi	636 km 395 mi	1,642 m 5,387 ft	23,610 km^{3} 5,660 cu mi	Deepest lake in the world and largest freshwater lake in the world by volume.
	8	Great Bear Lake	Canada	Fresh	31,153 km^{2} 12,028 sq mi	373 km 232 mi	446 m 1,463 ft	2,234 km^{3} 536 cu mi	Largest lake entirely within Canada, and the largest lake partially within the Arctic Circle
	9	Malawi (Nyasa)	Malawi; Mozambique; Tanzania	Fresh	29,600 km^{2} 11,400 sq mi	579 km 360 mi	706 m 2,316 ft	8,640 km^{3} 2,070 cu mi	Has more species of fish than any other lake in the world.
	10	Great Slave Lake	Canada	Fresh	27,200 km^{2} 10,500 sq mi	480 km 300 mi	614 m 2,014 ft	1,115 km^{3} 268 cu mi	Deepest lake in North America
	11	Erie	Canada; United States	Fresh	25,667 km^{2} 9,910 sq mi	388 km 241 mi	64 m 210 ft	488 km^{3} 117 cu mi	Has the smallest volume of the Great Lakes.
	12	Winnipeg	Canada	Fresh	24,514 km^{2} 9,465 sq mi	425 km 264 mi	36 m 118 ft	294 km^{3} 71 cu mi	Very large catchment area compared to own size. No other great lake has that ratio.
	13	Ontario	Canada; United States	Fresh	19,011 km^{2} 7,340 sq mi	311 km 193 mi	244 m 801 ft	1,631 km^{3} 391 cu mi	The lowest lying of the Great Lakes.
	14	Ladoga	Russia	Fresh	17,700 km^{2} 6,800 sq mi	219 km 136 mi	260 m 850 ft	837 km^{3} 201 cu mi	Largest lake in Europe.
	15	Balkhash	Kazakhstan	Saline 0.3% (variable)	16,400 km^{2} 6,300 sq mi	605 km 376 mi	26 m 85 ft	100 km^{3} 24 cu mi	Fresh shallow western part. Salty deeper eastern part. Shrinking in size.
	16	Vostok	Antarctica	Fresh	12,500 km^{2} 4,800 sq mi	250 km 160 mi	900 m 3,000 ft	5,400 ± 1,600 km^{3} 1,300 ± 380 cu mi	Largest lake in Antarctica, but subglacial.
	17	Onega	Russia	Fresh	9,700 km^{2} 3,700 sq mi	245 km 152 mi	127 m 417 ft	291 km^{3} 70 cu mi	Second-largest lake in Europe.
	18	Titicaca	Peru; Bolivia	Fresh	8,372 km^{2} 3,232 sq mi	177 km 110 mi	281 m 922 ft	896 km^{3} 215 cu mi	Highest navigable lake in the world. Largest mountain lake in the world. Largest lake in South America.
	19	Nicaragua	Nicaragua	Fresh	8,264 km^{2} 3,191 sq mi	177 km 110 mi	26 m 85 ft	110 km^{3} 26 cu mi	Largest lake in Central America. At one time, contained fresh water sharks.
	20	Athabasca	Canada	Fresh	7,850 km^{2} 3,030 sq mi	335 km 208 mi	124 m 407 ft	204 km^{3} 49 cu mi	A remnant of the vast, Glacial Lake McConnell. Huge catchment area (ratio).
	21	Reindeer	Canada	Fresh	6,650 km^{2} 2,570 sq mi	245 km 152 mi	219 m 719 ft	113 km^{3} 27 cu mi	The deepest areas are the site of a large meteor impact, which happened almost 100 million years ago. Much older than the lake.
	22	Turkana	Kenya; Ethiopia	Saline 0.25% (approx.)	6,405 km^{2} 2,473 sq mi	248 km 154 mi	109 m 358 ft	193 km^{3} 46 cu mi	Largest permanent desert lake and the world's largest alkaline lake.
	23	Issyk-Kul	Kyrgyzstan	Saline 0.6%	6,236 km^{2} 2,408 sq mi	182 km 113 mi	668 m 2,192 ft	1,736 km^{3} 416 cu mi	Second largest mountain lake in the world. Second deepest saline lake as well.
	24	Vänern	Sweden	Fresh	5,650 km^{2} 2,180 sq mi	140 km 87 mi	106 m 348 ft	153 km^{3} 37 cu mi	Largest lake in the European Union.
	25	Rukwa	Tanzania	Saline	5,614.7 km^{2} 2,167.8 sq mi	183 km 114 mi	22.49 m 73.8 ft	58.243 km^{3} 13.973 cu mi	Tanzania's 3rd largest lake.
	26	Albert	Uganda; Democratic Republic of the Congo	Fresh	5,590 km^{2} 2,160 sq mi	161 km 100 mi	51 m 167 ft	133 km^{3} 32 cu mi	
	27	Nettilling	Canada	Fresh	5,542 km^{2} 2,140 sq mi	113 km 70 mi	132 m 433 ft	130 km^{3} 31 cu mi	Largest lake on an island; Baffin Island.
	28	Winnipegosis	Canada	Fresh	5,370 km^{2} 2,070 sq mi	245 km 152 mi	12 m 39 ft	17.2 km^{3} 4.1 cu mi	Second largest lake in Manitoba.
	29	Mweru	Zambia; Democratic Republic of the Congo	Fresh	5,120 km^{2} 1,980 sq mi	131 km 81 mi	27 m 89 ft	38 km^{3} 9.1 cu mi	The second largest lake in the Congo's drainage basin, Tanganyika being the largest.
	30	Nipigon	Canada	Fresh	4,848 km^{2} 1,872 sq mi	116 km 72 mi	165 m 541 ft	266 km^{3} 64 cu mi	Largest lake entirely in Ontario. Part of the Great Lake drainage basin. Often referred to as the, "sixth" or "seventh" lake, together with St. Clair.
	31	Manitoba	Canada	Saline 0.35%	4,706 km^{2} 1,817 sq mi	225 km 140 mi	7 m 23 ft	14.1 km^{3} 3.4 cu mi	A remnant of the prehistoric, Glacial Lake Agassiz together with: Winnipeg and Winnipegosis.
	32	Taymyr	Russia	Fresh	4,560 km^{2} 1,760 sq mi	250 km 160 mi	26 m 85 ft	12.8 km^{3} 3.1 cu mi	Largest lake entirely within the Arctic Circle.
	33	Qinghai	China	Saline 1.4% (variable)	4,489 km^{2} 1,733 sq mi (2007)		32.8 m 108 ft	108 km^{3} 26 cu mi	Largest lake in China. Variable in size. Endorheic basin.
	34	Saimaa	Finland	Fresh	4,380 km^{2} 1,690 sq mi		82 m 269 ft	36 km^{3} 8.6 cu mi	Largest catchment area of the lakes within the Nordic countries.
	35	Lake of the Woods	Canada; United States	Fresh	4,350 km^{2} 1,680 sq mi	110 km 68 mi	64 m 210 ft	19.4 km^{3} 4.7 cu mi	About 15,000 islands. The shoreline (including these) measures roughly 105,000 kilometres (65,000 mi). Separates the northernmost point of the contiguous United States from the rest of the United States.
	36	Khanka	Russia; China	Fresh	4,190 km^{2} 1,620 sq mi	90 km 56 mi	10.6 m 35 ft	18.3 km^{3} 4.4 cu mi	Has a shape like a pear. Variable size. Drains through the Amur River, that ends in the Sea of Japan.
	37	Sarygamysh	Turkmenistan; Uzbekistan	Saline 1.15% (approx.)	3,955 km^{2} 1,527 sq mi	125 km 78 mi	40 m 130 ft	68.56 km^{3} 16.45 cu mi	Located about midway between the Caspian Endorheic basin and former Aral Sea. No drainage river today. Drained centuries ago to the Caspian Sea (Uzboy River). Polluted.
	38	Dubawnt	Canada	Fresh	3,833 km^{2} 1,480 sq mi			91 km^{3} 22 cu mi	Frozen surface 10 months each year. No permanent settlements on its shores.
	39	Van	Turkey	Saline 2.3%	3,755 km^{2} 1,450 sq mi	119 km 74 mi	451 m 1,480 ft	642 km^{3} 154 cu mi	Largest lake in the Middle East. Third deepest saline lake.
	40	Peipus	Estonia; Russia	Fresh	3,555 km^{2} 1,373 sq mi		15.3 m 50 ft	25 km^{3} 6.0 cu mi	Largest trans-boundary lake in Europe.
	41	Uvs	Mongolia Russia	Saline 1.9% (approx.)	3,350 km^{2} 1,290 sq mi	84 km 52 mi	22 m 72 ft	20 km^{3} 4.8 cu mi	Greatest lake in Mongolia (by area). Very large catchment area (endorheic).
	42	North Aral Sea	Kazakhstan	Variable: from 0.9 to 1.2%	3,300 km^{2} 1,300 sq mi		42 m 138 ft	28.7 km^{3} 6.9 cu mi	Largest remnant of the former Aral Sea. Once the world's third largest lake.
	43	Poyang	China	Fresh	3,210 km^{2} 1,240 sq mi	170 km 110 mi	25.1 m 82 ft	25.2 km^{3} 6.0 cu mi	Largest fresh water lake in China. Variable size. Important location for the birdlife.
	44	Tana	Ethiopia	Fresh	3,200 km^{2} 1,200 sq mi	84 km 52 mi	15 m 49 ft	25.6 km^{3} 6.1 cu mi	The source of the Blue Nile.
	45	Amadjuak	Canada	Fresh	3,115 km^{2} 1,203 sq mi			74 km^{3} 18 cu mi	In geological terms, a "young" lake (approximately 4,500 years old). Second largest on Baffin Island, third largest in Nunavut.
	46	Melville	Canada	Saline 1.95% (approx. average of surface and bottom water)	3,069 km^{2} 1,185 sq mi	140 km 87 mi	256 m 840 ft	313 km^{3} 75 cu mi	Estuary connected with the Atlantic Ocean. Large drainage basin in the Labrador.
	47	Bangweulu	Zambia	Fresh	3,000 km^{2} 1,200 sq mi (permanent)	75 km 47 mi	10 m 33 ft	12 km^{3} 2.9 cu mi	One of the world's great wetland systems. The area has swamps and floodplain. Variable size on this shallow lake. Crucial importance for animals and birds, of a far larger area.

Source for the 20 largest lakes (and their areas):

== Geological list ==
Following are the dozen largest lakes under geological definitions, down to 17,500 km^{2} (6,800 sq mi) in area.

Continent colour key
Africa	Asia	Europe	North America

Thumbnail, at fixed scale		Name	Countries with shoreline	Type	Area	Length	Max. depth	Volume	Notes
	1	Michigan–Huron	Canada; United States	Fresh	117,620 km^{2} 45,410 sq mi	710 km 440 mi	282 m 925 ft	8,450 km^{3} 2,030 cu mi	Contains Manitoulin Island, the world's largest lake island.
	2	Superior	Canada; United States	Fresh	82,100 km^{2} 31,700 sq mi	616 km 383 mi	406 m 1,332 ft	12,070 km^{3} 2,900 cu mi	Largest of the four geological Great Lakes by volume, having more water than the other three combined.
	3	Victoria	Tanzania; Uganda; Kenya	Fresh	59,940 km^{2} 23,140 sq mi	322 km 200 mi	81 m 266 ft	2,420 km^{3} 580 cu mi	The largest lake by area in Africa.
	4	Tanganyika	Tanzania; Democratic Republic of the Congo; Burundi; Zambia	Fresh	32,900 km^{2} 12,700 sq mi	676 km 420 mi	1,470 m 4,820 ft	18,750 km^{3} 4,500 cu mi	Second-largest lake by volume and second longest.
	5	Baikal	Russia	Fresh	31,722 km^{2} 12,248 sq mi	636 km 395 mi	1,642 m 5,387 ft	23,610 km^{3} 5,660 cu mi	Deepest lake in the world and largest by volume.
	6	Great Bear Lake	Canada	Fresh	31,153 km^{2} 12,028 sq mi	373 km 232 mi	446 m 1,463 ft	2,234 km^{3} 536 cu mi	Largest lake entirely within Canada, and the largest lake partially within the Arctic Circle
	7	Malawi	Malawi; Mozambique; Tanzania	Fresh	29,500 km^{2} 11,400 sq mi	579 km 360 mi	706 m 2,316 ft	8,640 km^{3} 2,070 cu mi	Has more species of fish than any other lake in the world.
	8	Great Slave Lake	Canada	Fresh	27,200 km^{2} 10,500 sq mi	480 km 300 mi	614 m 2,014 ft	1,115 km^{3} 268 cu mi	Deepest lake in North America
	9	Erie	Canada; United States	Fresh	25,667 km^{2} 9,910 sq mi	388 km 241 mi	64 m 210 ft	488 km^{3} 117 cu mi	Has the smallest volume of the Great Lakes.
	10	Winnipeg	Canada	Fresh	24,514 km^{2} 9,465 sq mi	425 km 264 mi	36 m 118 ft	294 km^{3} 71 cu mi	Very large catchment area compared to own size. No other great lake has that ratio.
	11	Ontario	Canada; United States	Fresh	18,970 km^{2} 7,320 sq mi	311 km 193 mi	244 m 801 ft	1,631 km^{3} 391 cu mi	The lowest lying of the Great Lakes.
	12	Ladoga	Russia	Fresh	17,700 km^{2} 6,800 sq mi	219 km 136 mi	260 m 850 ft	837 km^{3} 201 cu mi	Largest lake in Europe.

== See also ==
The Aral Sea 1960 to 2014.

- List of lakes by volume
- List of lakes by depth
- List of largest lakes of Europe
- Recursive islands and lakes
- Aral Sea, formerly the third largest lake in the world, with an area of 68,000 km^{2} (26,300 sq mi)
- Lake Chad, formerly the eleventh largest lake in the world, with an area of 26,000 km^{2} (10,000 sq mi)
- Lake Urmia, formerly with an area of 5,200 km^{2} (2,000 sq mi), but down to a tenth that size in 2017. It has since increased in area under a restoration project.
- List of largest lagoons
- List of largest lakes and seas in the Solar System

== Notes and references ==
Note: Lake areas may slightly vary depending on the sources.

Notes
