= St. Ignace Island =

Canadian island in Lake Superior

- Interactive map of St. Ignace Island

Geography
- Location: Great Lakes
- Coordinates: 48°47′33″N 87°55′43″W
- Area: 274 km^{2} (106 sq mi)
- Highest elevation: 565 m (1854 ft)
- Highest point: Mount St. Ignace

Administration
- Canada
- Province: Ontario

Demographics
- Population: Uninhabited

St. Ignace Island (French: Île Saint-Ignace), in northern Lake Superior in Ontario, Canada, is the eleventh-largest lake island in the world. With an area of 274 km^{2} (106 sq mi), it is also the second-largest lake island in Lake Superior, following Isle Royale, and the fifth largest of all the islands on the Great Lakes, trailing Manitoulin Island, Isle Royale, St. Joseph Island and Drummond Island.

St. Ignace Island, which is uninhabited, is situated near the north shore of Lake Superior at the entrance to that lake's Nipigon Bay, in Northern Ontario. The English name is a translation of the original French name given it by Jesuit missionaries in honor of their founder St. Ignatius of Loyola. The island is clearly depicted on the 1669 map "Lac Tracy ou Superieur avec les dependances de la Mission du Saint Esprit" attributed to Claude-Jean Allouez and Jacques Marquette.

Nipigon Strait separates it from the large Black Bay peninsula. St. Ignace Island lies next to Simpson Island. The island is about 20 km (12 mi) from the nearest community, Red Rock, Ontario. The island's Mount St. Ignace is the highest point of the many islands in Lake Superior, at 565 m (1,854 ft) above sea level, though lower than the other high points in Northern Ontario, including the 693 m (2,274 ft) Ishpatina Ridge, highest point in Ontario.

== Climate ==
The island has a humid continental climate. St. Ignace Island has incredible seasonal lag due to maritime influences. August and September are the warmest months and February is the coldest month by a substantial margin.

St. Ignace Island

Climate chart (precipitation, max. and min. temperature)
J	F	M	A	M	J	J	A	S	O	N	D
75 −8 −11	49 −15 −16	61 −4 −9	89 3 −4	120 6 2	112 10 4	103 12 7	73 15 11	108 14 12	100 9 6	81 4 −1	55 −7 −8
- █ Average max. and min. temperatures in °C
- █ Precipitation totals in mm
Imperial conversion
J	F	M	A	M	J	J	A	S	O	N	D
3 18 12	1.9 5 3	2.4 25 16	3.5 37 25	4.7 43 36	4.4 50 39	4.1 54 45	2.9 59 52	4.3 57 54	3.9 48 43	3.2 39 30	2.2 19 18
- █ Average max. and min. temperatures in °F
- █ Precipitation totals in inches
