= Savivesi =

Body of water in Finland

- Location within Finland
- Coordinates: 61°43′N 27°52′E
- Primary inflows: Konnuskoski rapids, Konnus canal
- Catchment area: Vuoksi
- Basin countries: Finland
- Surface area: 12.891 km^{2} (4.977 sq mi)
- Average depth: 3.19 m (10.5 ft)
- Max. depth: 19 m (62 ft)
- Water volume: 0.0421 km^{3} (34,100 acre⋅ft)
- Shore length^{1}: 99.49 km (61.82 mi)
- Surface elevation: 81.3 m (267 ft)
- Frozen: December–April
- Islands: Leppäsalo (about 10 km^{2}), Talvisalo
- Settlements: Leppävirta
- ^{1} Shore length is not a well-defined measure.

Savivesi is a medium-sized lake in the Vuoksi main catchment area. It is located in Leppävirta municipality, in the Northern Savonia region, in Finland. Savivesi's elevation is almost the same as the lake Unnukka's elevation, and it is possible to see them as one lake.

== See also ==
- List of lakes in Finland
