= Kokkosaari =

Island in Finland

Coordinates: 61°59.2′N 29°13′E

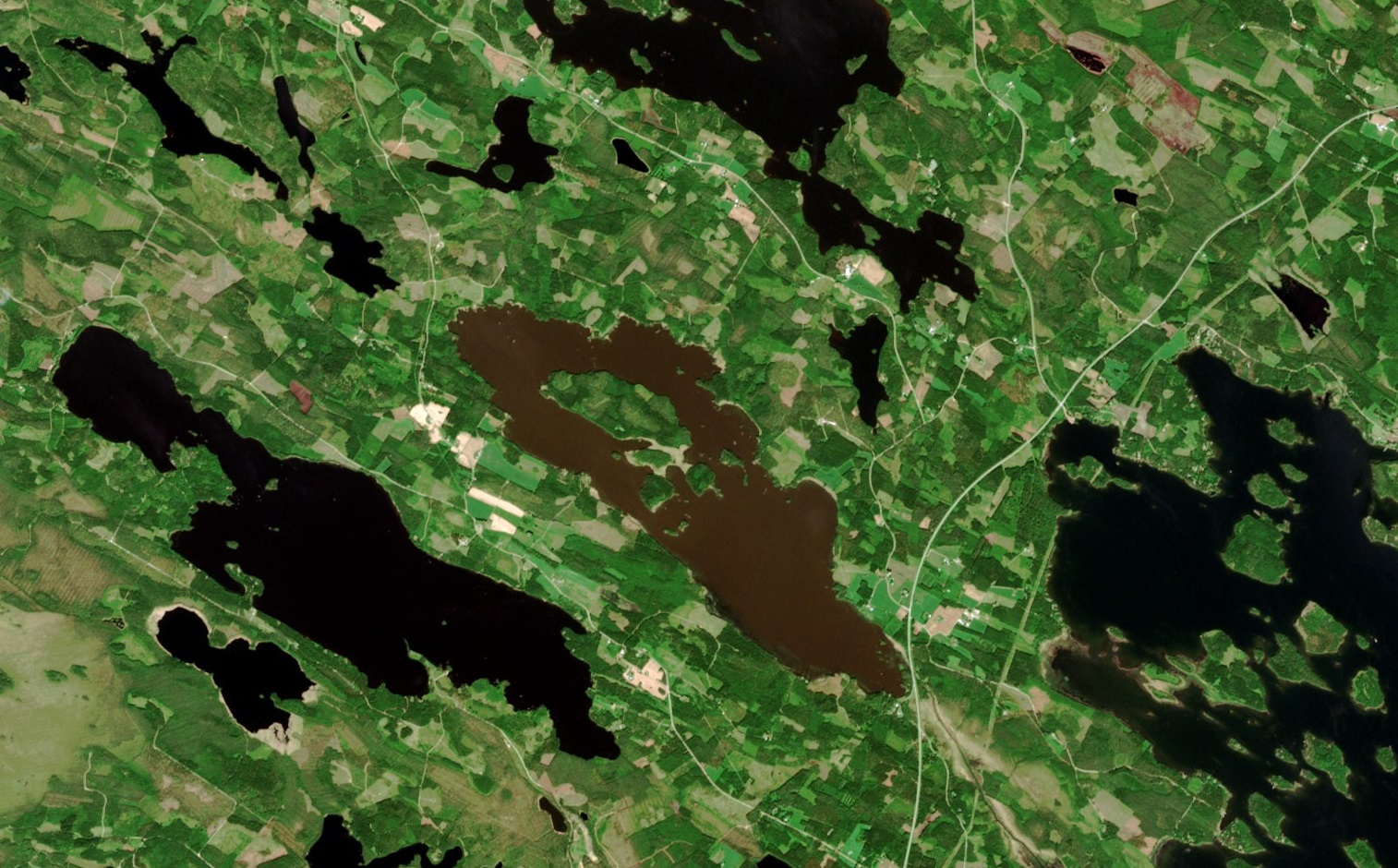
Kokkosaari, Savonlinna, as seen by Sentinel-2 of the ESA.

Kokkosaari is the largest island in a lake on an island in a lake in the world. It is located in Kuonanjärvi on the Sääminginsalo island, which has been claimed to be the largest island in Finland. Kokkosaari is almost 2000 m long, with a width of 400–900 m.
