= List of lakes by volume =

Overview of the world's largest lakes by volume

This article lists lakes with a water volume of more than 100 km^{3}, ranked by volume. The volume of a lake is a difficult quantity to measure. Generally, the volume must be inferred from bathymetric data by integration. Lake volumes can also change dramatically over time and during the year, especially for salt lakes in arid climates. For these reasons, and because of changing research, information on lake volumes can vary considerably from source to source. The base data for this article are from The Water Encyclopedia (1990). Where volume data from more recent surveys or other authoritative sources have been used, that usage is referenced in the respective entry. The total volume of Earth's lakes is 199,000 km^{3}.

== The list ==
The volumes of the lakes below vary little by season. This list does not include reservoirs; if it did, six reservoirs would appear on the list: Lake Kariba at 26th, Bratsk Reservoir, Lake Volta, Lake Nasser, Manicouagan Reservoir, and Lake Guri.

Estuaries and lagoons are not included either. Examples: Lake Melville (estuary) and Lake Maracaibo (lagoon), comparable with Lagoa dos Patos.

Continent color key
Africa	Antarctica	Asia	Eurasia	Europe	North America	South America

	Name	Country	Region	Surface area	Volume	Salinity
1	Caspian Sea	Kazakhstan; Turkmenistan; Azerbaijan; Russia; Iran	Caspian endorheic basin	371,000 km^{2} (143,000 sq mi)	78,200 km^{3} (18,800 cu mi)	1.2%
2	Baikal	Russia	Southern Siberia: Buryatia and Irkutsk Oblast	31,722 km^{2} (12,248 sq mi)	23,610 km^{3} (5,660 cu mi)	Fresh
3	Tanganyika	Tanzania; Democratic Republic of the Congo; Burundi; Zambia	African Great Lakes	32,900 km^{2} (12,700 sq mi)	18,750 km^{3} (4,500 cu mi)	Fresh
4	Superior	Canada; United States	North American Great Lakes	82,100 km^{2} (31,700 sq mi)	12,070 km^{3} (2,900 cu mi)	Fresh
5	Malawi	Malawi; Mozambique; Tanzania	African Great Lakes	29,600 km^{2} (11,400 sq mi)	8,640 km^{3} (2,070 cu mi)	Fresh
6	Vostok	Antarctica	Under the East Antarctic Ice Sheet	12,500 km^{2} (4,800 sq mi)	5,400±1,600 km^{3} (~1,300 cu mi)	Fresh
7	Michigan (Note: Although Lake Michigan and Lake Huron are usually considered distinct, they are sometimes regarded as a single lake known as Lake Michigan–Huron. When treated as a single entity, it is the sixth largest freshwater lake by volume, at 8,443 km^{3} (2,026 cu mi).)	United States	North American Great Lakes	58,030 km^{2} (22,410 sq mi)	4,930 km^{3} (1,180 cu mi)	Fresh
8	Huron	Canada; United States	North American Great Lakes	59,590 km^{2} (23,010 sq mi)	3,520 km^{3} (840 cu mi)	Fresh
9	Victoria	Tanzania; Uganda; Kenya	African Great Lakes	59,940 km^{2} (23,140 sq mi)	2,420 km^{3} (580 cu mi)	Fresh
10	Great Bear	Canada	Northwest Territories	31,153 km^{2} (12,028 sq mi)	2,234 km^{3} (536 cu mi)	Fresh
11	Issyk-Kul	Kyrgyzstan	Tien Shan Mountains	6,236 km^{2} (2,408 sq mi)	1,736 km^{3} (416 cu mi)	0.6%
12	Ontario	Canada; United States	North American Great Lakes	18,970 km^{2} (7,320 sq mi)	1,631 km^{3} (391 cu mi)	Fresh
13	Great Slave	Canada	Northwest Territories	27,200 km^{2} (10,500 sq mi)	1,115 km^{3} (268 cu mi)	Fresh
14	Titicaca	Peru; Bolivia	Puno Region (Peru) and La Paz Department (Bolivia)	8,372 km^{2} (3,232 sq mi)	896 km^{3} (215 cu mi)	Fresh
15	Ladoga	Russia	Leningrad Oblast and Republic of Karelia	17,700 km^{2} (6,800 sq mi)	837 km^{3} (201 cu mi)	Fresh
16	General Carrera-Buenos Aires	Chile; Argentina	General Carrera Province (Chile) and Santa Cruz Province (Argentina)	1,850 km^{2} (710 sq mi)	740 km^{3} (180 cu mi)	Fresh
17	Kivu	Democratic Republic of the Congo; Rwanda	African Great Lakes	2,700 km^{2} (1,000 sq mi)	648 km^{3} (155 cu mi)	Fresh
18	Van	Turkey	Armenian Highlands	3,755 km^{2} (1,450 sq mi)	642 km^{3} (154 cu mi)	2.3%
19	Erie	Canada; United States	North American Great Lakes	25,667 km^{2} (9,910 sq mi)	488 km^{3} (117 cu mi)	Fresh
20	Khövsgöl	Mongolia	Nearby the eastern, Sayan Mountains	2,760 km^{2} (1,070 sq mi)	381 km^{3} (91 cu mi)	Fresh
21	Winnipeg	Canada	Manitoba	24,514 km^{2} (9,465 sq mi)	294 km^{3} (71 cu mi)	Fresh
22	Onega	Russia	Leningrad Oblast, Vologda Oblast and Republic of Karelia	9,700 km^{2} (3,700 sq mi)	291 km^{3} (70 cu mi)	Fresh
23	Nipigon	Canada	Ontario	4,848 km^{2} (1,872 sq mi)	266 km^{3} (64 cu mi)	Fresh
24	Toba	Indonesia	Sumatra	1,130 km^{2} (440 sq mi)	244 km^{3} (59 cu mi)	Fresh
25	Nueltin	Canada	Nunavut and Manitoba	2,279 km^{2} (880 sq mi)	228 km^{3} (55 cu mi)	Fresh
26	Argentino	Argentina	Santa Cruz Province	1,466 km^{2} (566 sq mi)	220 km^{3} (53 cu mi)	Fresh
27	Athabasca	Canada	Saskatchewan and Alberta	7,850 km^{2} (3,030 sq mi)	204 km^{3} (49 cu mi)	Fresh
28	Concordia	Antarctica	Antarctic Plateau	800 km^{2} (310 sq mi)	200 km^{3} (48 cu mi) + or - 40 km^{3} (9.6 cu mi)	Fresh
29	Turkana	Kenya; Ethiopia	African Great Lakes	6,405 km^{2} (2,473 sq mi)	193 km^{3} (46 cu mi)	0.24%
30	Llanquihue	Chile	Llanquihue Province and Osorno Province	871 km^{2} (336 sq mi)	158 km^{3} (38 cu mi)	Fresh
31	Vänern	Sweden	Västergötland, Dalsland, Värmland	5,650 km^{2} (2,180 sq mi)	153 km^{3} (37 cu mi)	Fresh
32	Tahoe	United States	California and Nevada	490 km^{2} (190 sq mi)	151 km^{3} (36 cu mi)	Fresh
33	Mistassini	Canada	Quebec	2,164 km^{2} (836 sq mi)	150 km^{3} (36 cu mi)	Fresh
34	Albert	Uganda; Democratic Republic of the Congo	African Great Lakes	5,300 km^{2} (2,000 sq mi)	133 km^{3} (32 cu mi)	Fresh
35	Nettilling	Canada	Nunavut (Baffin Island)	5,542 km^{2} (2,140 sq mi)	130 km^{3} (31 cu mi)	Fresh
36	Fagnano	Argentina; Chile	Tierra del Fuego	645 km^{2} (249 sq mi)	125 km^{3} (30 cu mi)	Fresh
37	Viedma	Argentina	Santa Cruz Province	1,193 km^{2} (461 sq mi)	119 km^{3} (29 cu mi)	Fresh
38	Iliamna	United States	Alaska	2,622 km^{2} (1,012 sq mi)	116 km^{3} (28 cu mi)	Fresh
39	Dead Sea	Jordan; Palestine; Israel	Southern District, West Bank, Balqa Governorate, Madaba Governorate and Karak Governorate	605 km^{2} (234 sq mi)	114 km^{3} (27 cu mi) (decreasing)	34% (increasing)
40	Baker	Canada	Nunavut	1,887 km^{2} (729 sq mi)	113 km^{3} (27 cu mi)	Fresh
41	Reindeer	Canada	Saskatchewan and Manitoba	6,650 km^{2} (2,570 sq mi)	113 km^{3} (27 cu mi)	Fresh
42	Nicaragua	Nicaragua	Rivas Department, Granada Department and Río San Juan Department	8,264 km^{2} (3,191 sq mi)	110 km^{3} (26 cu mi)	Fresh
43	Qinghai	China	Qinghai Province	4,583 km^{2} (1,770 sq mi)	108 km^{3} (26 cu mi)	1.4% (variable)
44	Balkhash	Kazakhstan	Karaganda Region, Jambyl Region and Almaty Region	16,400 km^{2} (6,300 sq mi)	100 km^{3} (24 cu mi) (decreasing)	0.3% (variable)

In 1960, the Aral Sea was the world's twelfth-largest known lake by volume, at 1,100 km^{3} (260 cu mi). However, by 2007 it had shrunk to 10% of its original volume and was divided into three lakes, none of which are large enough to appear on this list.

== By continent ==
- Africa: Tanganyika
- Antarctica: Vostok
- Asia: Baikal
- Eurasia: Caspian Sea
- Europe: Ladoga
- North America: Superior
- Oceania: Taupō
  - Australia: Eyre, native designation: Kati Thanda
- South America: Titicaca

== See also ==
- List of lakes by area
- List of lakes by depth
- List of largest lakes of Europe
