= Glover Island =

Island in Newfoundland and Labrador, Canada

Coordinates: 48°46′52″N 57°41′54″W

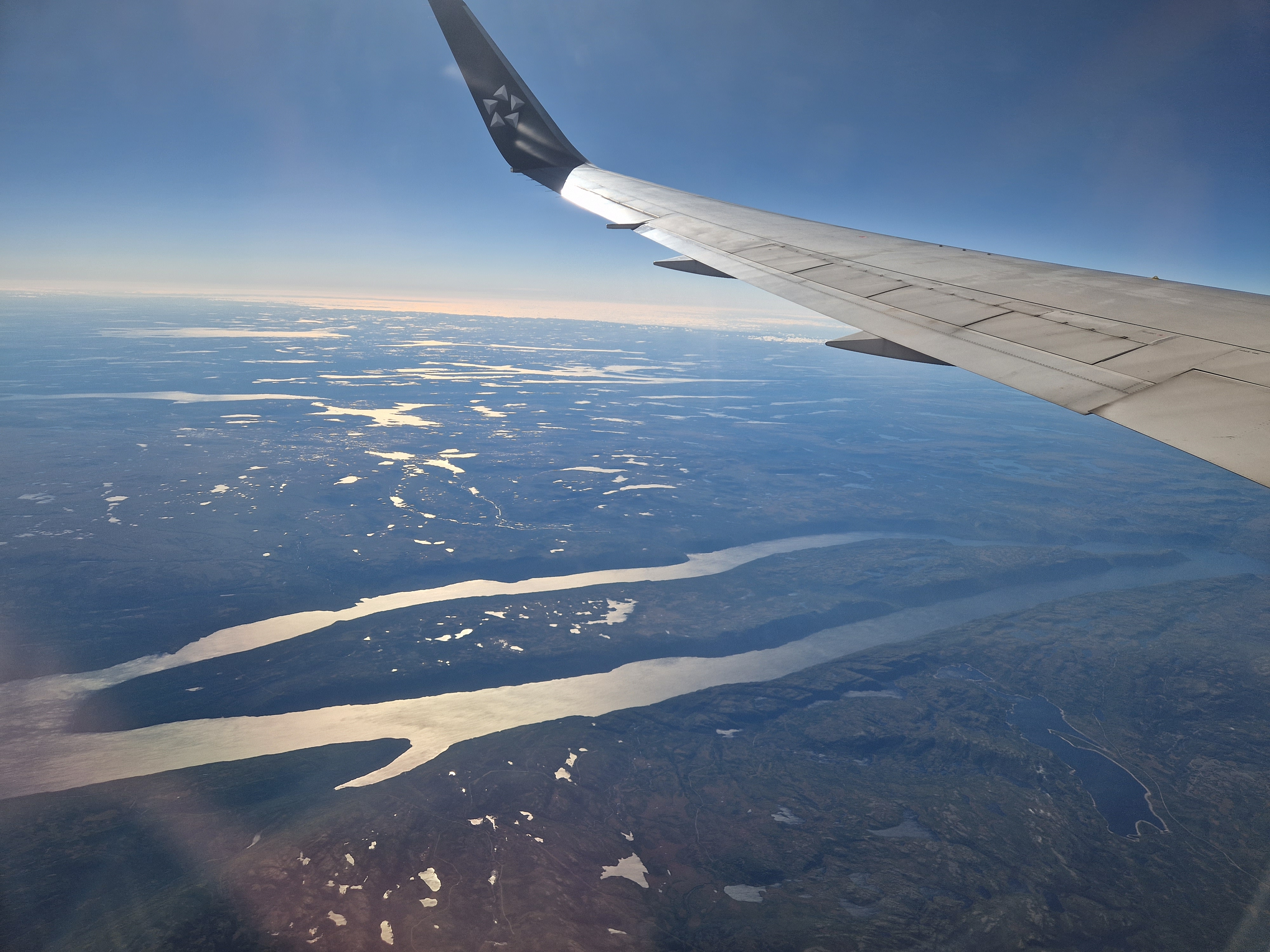
Glover Island

Glover Island is a large (178 km^{2}) lake island in the interior of the Island of Newfoundland in the province of Newfoundland and Labrador, Canada. The island was named after Sir John Hawley Glover, former governor of Newfoundland. It is the 18th largest lake island in the world by area, and the largest natural island in a lake on an island. The island is located in Grand Lake, a natural lake whose waters were raised for the Deer Lake Power Development. Historic maps show that Glover Island pre-dates this.

Location of Glover Island in Newfoundland

The island lies in a general north-east, south-west direction in the Appalachian Mountains of Newfoundland. The island is elongated, measuring 24.2 miles at its longest axis by a medium width of 3.2 miles. The island is known to be rich in minerals and is currently undergoing exploration for precious metals.

Glover Island is dotted by other ponds and lakes. Near the centre of the island is a lake, measuring 1.3 miles by 0.5 miles; its area is 1.41 km^{2}, thus making it one of the largest lakes on an island in a lake on an island (larger than Crater Lake (Philippines) at 1.17 km^{2}). This lake contains seven other islands with the largest of those measuring 112 m by 112 m .

== See also ==
- Geography of Newfoundland and Labrador
- Recursive islands and lakes
