= Little Lake (Wisconsin) =

Lake in Door County, Wisconsin, USA

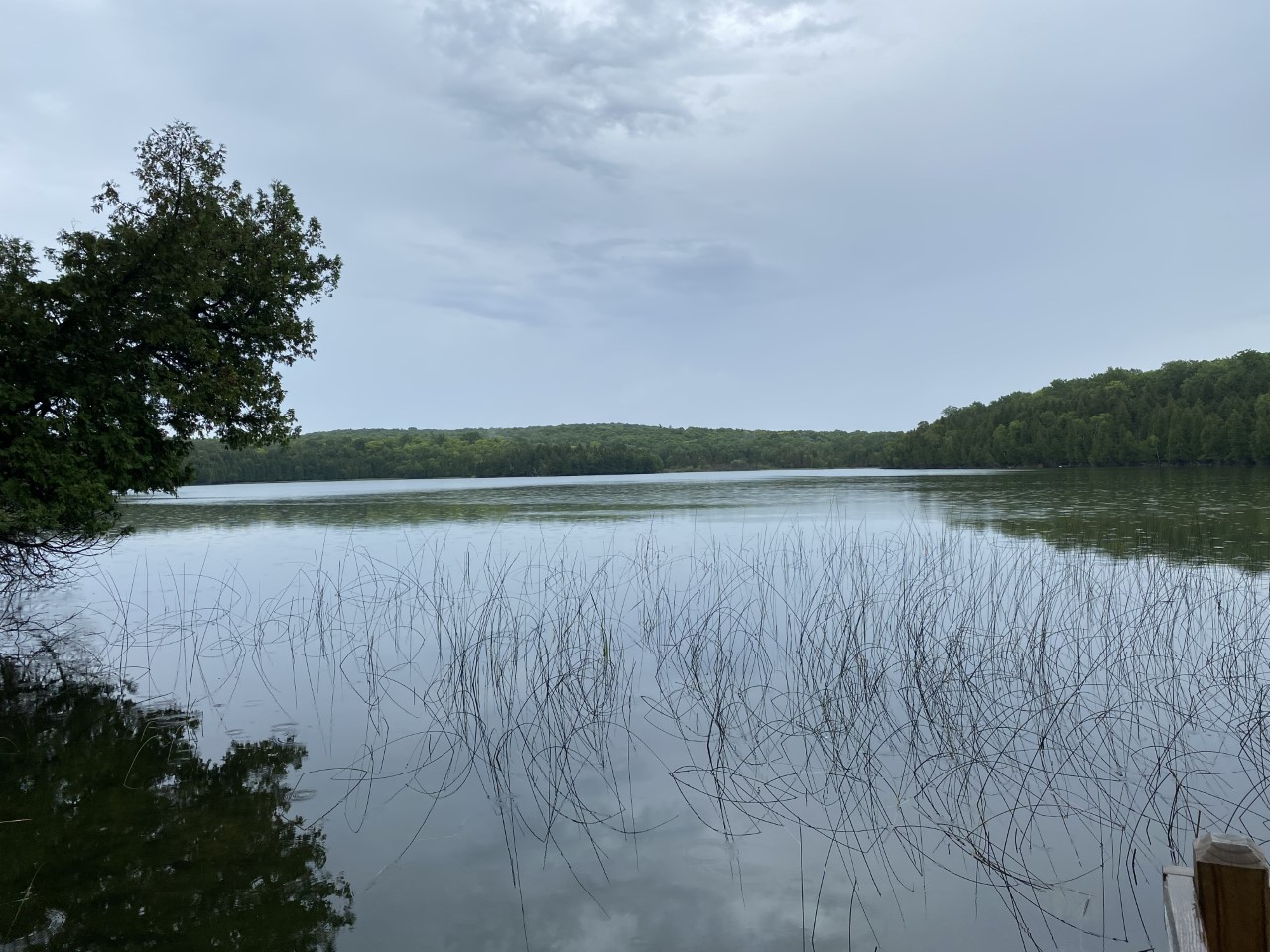
- Little Lake facing north.

- Location within Wisconsin Location within the United States
- Location: Door County, Wisconsin
- Coordinates: 45.4100164°N 86.9413005°W
- Basin countries: United States
- Surface area: 41 acres (0.064 sq mi; 0.17 km^{2})
- Max. depth: 6 ft (1.8 m)
- Surface elevation: 584 feet (178 m)

Little Lake is a lake located in Door County, Wisconsin. The lake is found on Washington Island in Green Bay of Lake Michigan. Little Lake has a surface area of 41 acres (0.17 km^{2}) and a max depth of 6 ft (1.8 m). Most of the lake is shallow and has a bottom that is muck. Although the northwest corner of the lake is only 250 ft (76 m) from Lake Michigan, the lake is spring fed. It is a recursive lake, due to it being a lake on an island. The shore around the lake is partially owned by the Door County Land Trust. This area is designated as a Wisconsin State Natural Area by the Wisconsin Department of Natural Resources.

There are seven lakes in Wisconsin that are named Little Lake.

== See also ==
- List of lakes of Wisconsin § Door County
