= Haukivesi =

Lake in the country of Finland

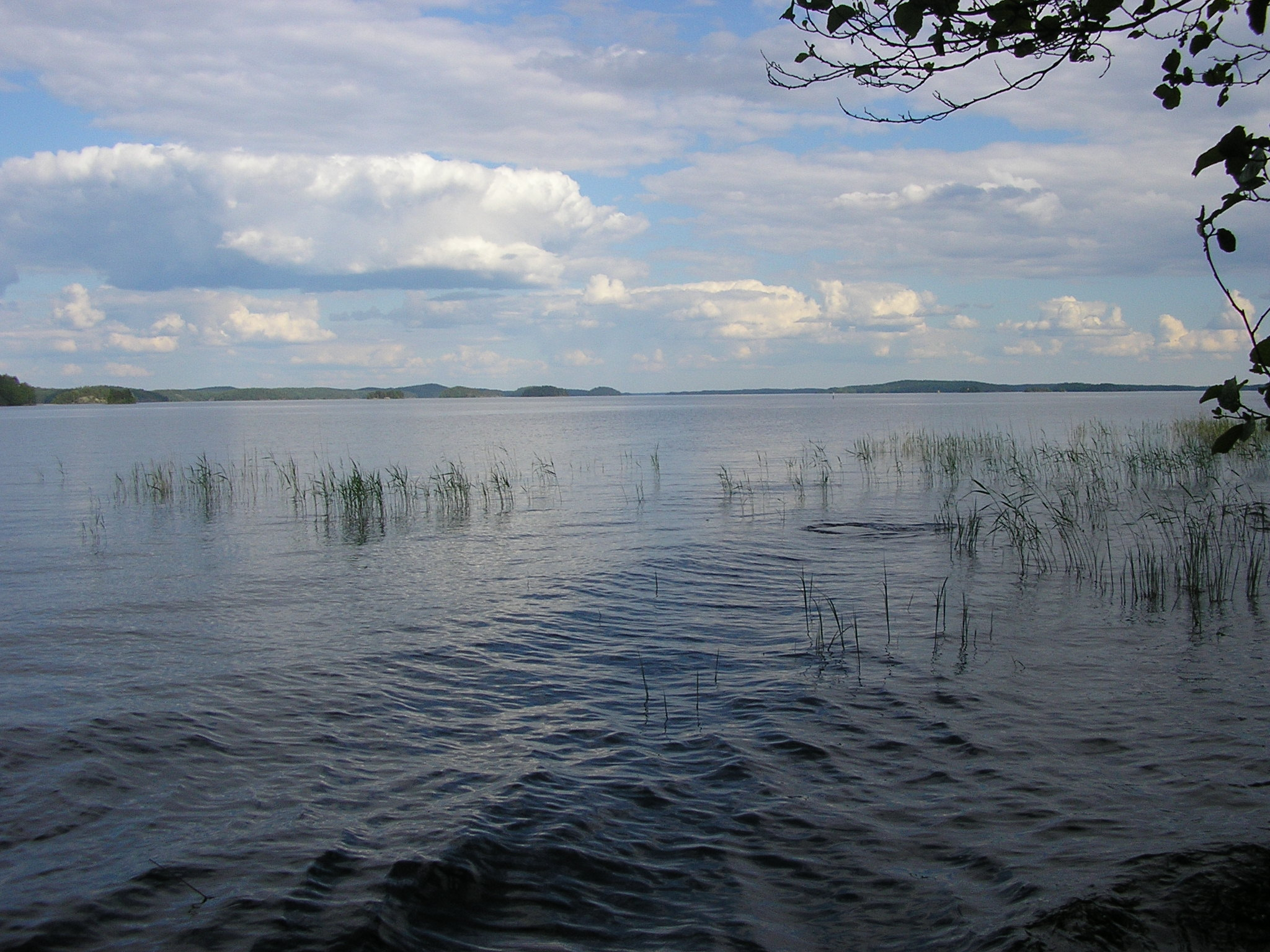
- Peonselkä in Lake Haukivesi, Rantasalmi, Finland

- Location within Finland
- Location: Eastern Finland
- Coordinates: 62°06′N 028°26′E
- Primary inflows: Pirttivirta, Tappuravirta, Oravinkoski
- Primary outflows: Matarinsalmi
- Basin countries: Finland
- Max. length: 80 km (50 mi)
- Surface area: 562.31 km^{2} (217.11 sq mi)
- Surface elevation: 75.8 m (249 ft)
- Settlements: Rantasalmi, Savonlinna, Varkaus

Haukivesi is a lake in southeastern Finland and a part of the Saimaa lake system. Haukivesi is the central basin of the system, collecting 80% of the water that eventually flows into Lake Ladoga through River Vuoksi. Its area is 562.31 square kilometres (217.11 sq mi) (8th). Like other lakes in the system, it has a convoluted shoreline with numerous islands and is divided into a number of smaller regions (selkä) such as Siitinselkä, Saviluoto, Tahkoselkä, Vuoriselkä, Kuokanselkä, Kuivaselkä, Heposelkä, Peonselkä, Tuunaanselkä, Hiekonselkä, Varparannanselkä, and Iso-Haukivesi. Haukivesi stretches from Varkaus to Savonlinna in a northeast–southwest direction. The northern part is shallow, at less than 20 metres (66 ft), but deepens toward the southeast, up to 60 metres (200 ft) at Kuivaselkä.

Most water flows from the east, through Tappuvirta, Oravikoski and Haponlahti locks. A smaller inflow is from the north, through Pirtinvirta in Varkaus. Of the lakes in the Saimaa lake system, Haukivesi receives the most nutrients. The water quality varies with location, because of the differences between the water qualities of the inflows. In Haukivesi, more nutrient-rich water flowing from the north mixes with purer waters from the east. The largest individual pollution sources are the city of Varkaus and its pulp mills, although smaller settlements and diffuse pollution from agriculture and forestry contribute. The lake was heavily polluted by the pulp mills up to the 70s, but stricter regulation forced the mills to treat their wastewaters, and thus the lake recovered.

The southernmost part of Haukivesi is Haapavesi, and most of its southern shoreline is covered by the city of Savonlinna. Water flows via Matarinsalmi sound into Haapavesi, from where it flows through several channels into the Pihlajavesi part of Saimaa.

Linnansaari National Park is located in the middle of the lake. The name Haukivesi means "pike water", and indeed, the lake is known as a good place to catch pikes, in addition to bream, perch and zander. However, there are restrictions on fishing because of the national park and protection of the endangered Saimaa ringed seal.
