= Lake Michigan–Huron =

Combined lake system in North America

- Lake Michigan–Huron lies in the center of the Great Lakes

- Location within North America
- Location: United States, Canada
- Group: Great Lakes
- Coordinates: 45.814°N 84.754°W
- Lake type: Glacial
- Primary inflows: St. Marys River
- Primary outflows: St. Clair River
- Basin countries: United States, Canada
- Surface area: 45,300 sq mi (117,300 km^{2})
- Max. depth: 925 ft (282 m)
- Water volume: 2,029 cu mi (8,460 km^{3})
- Residence time: 100 years
- Shore length^{1}: 3,250 mi (5,230 km) plus 2,215 mi (3,565 km) for islands
- Surface elevation: 577 ft (176 m)
- Settlements: Milwaukee, Chicago, Sarnia, Owen Sound, Cheboygan, Sheboygan, Port Huron, Traverse City
- ^{1} Shore length is not a well-defined measure.

Lake Michigan–Huron (also Huron–Michigan) is the body of water combining Lake Michigan and Lake Huron, which are joined through the 5-mile-wide (8.0 km), 295-foot-deep (90 m), open-water Straits of Mackinac. Huron and Michigan are hydrologically a single lake because the flow of water through the straits keeps their water levels in overall equilibrium. Although the flow is generally eastward from Lake Michigan to Lake Huron, the water moves in either direction depending on local conditions. Combined, Lake Michigan–Huron is the largest freshwater lake by area in the world. Lake Superior is larger than either individually, so it is counted as the largest of the Great Lakes when Lake Michigan and Lake Huron are considered separately.

== Geologic history ==
During the last glacial maximum, the sizes and connectivity of the two lake basins varied dramatically over time. Sequential advances and retreats of the Laurentian ice sheet repeatedly opened and dammed various possible outlets from the area, as well as providing dramatically varying amounts of meltwater to the system. Numerous proglacial lakes formed in various places and configurations as the ice sheet advanced and retreated. At various times, what is now Michigan–Huron was clearly separated into two or more lakes, and at other times was part of a single, deeper lake.

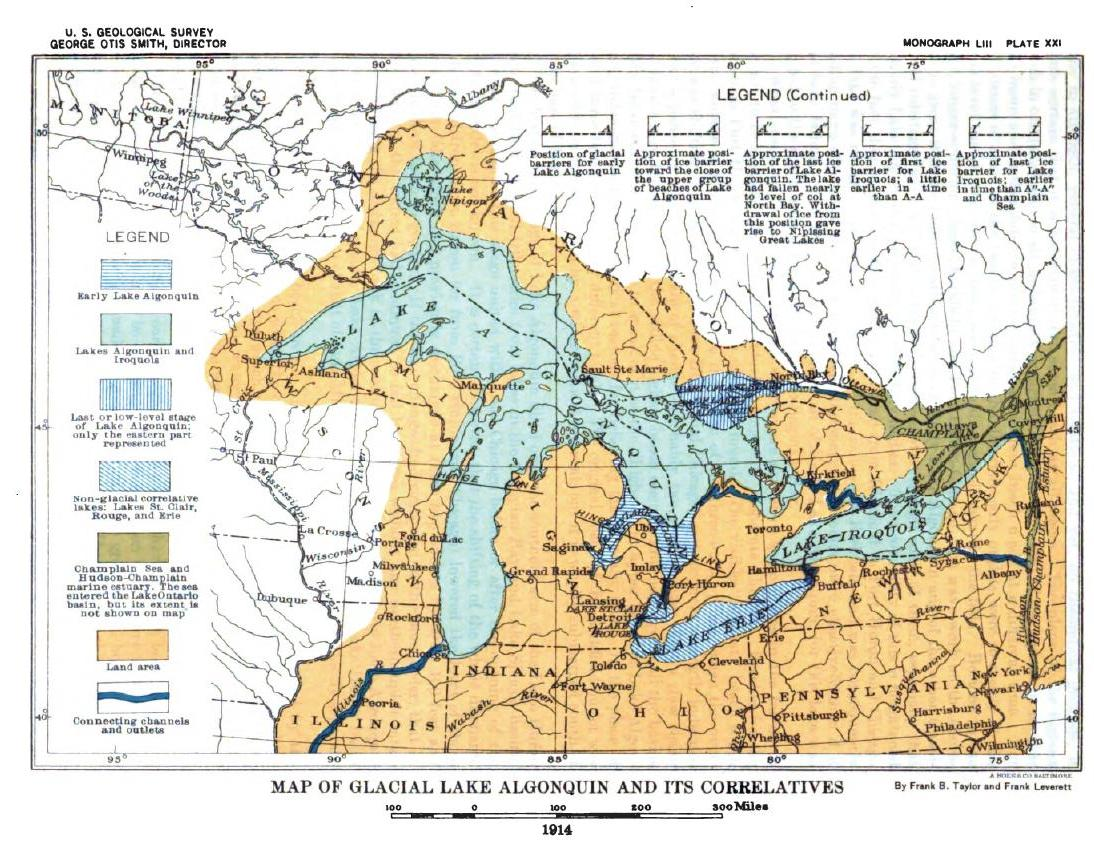
Glacial Lake Algonquin and its Correlatives, approximately 11,000 years ago

Around 9,000 years BC, as the ice sheet retreated, the modern Lakes Huron, Michigan, and much of Superior, were a single lake known to geologists as Lake Algonquin. Ice sheets dammed Lake Algonquin to the northeast. Before that, Lake Chicago occupied the southern tip of the Lake Michigan basin, at the southern end of the ice sheet. Lake Algonquin and Lake Chicago both drained south into the Mississippi River watershed. Around 9,500 years ago, new pathways draining the system to the east were opened by the retreat of the ice, and proglacial Lake Stanley (precursor of Lake Huron) was separated from proglacial Lake Chippewa (precursor of Lake Michigan), with Lake Chippewa at a slightly higher level. They were connected by the now-submerged Mackinac Channel, which discharged into Lake Stanley over Mackinac Falls. Ongoing warping of the land by post-glacial rebound due to the retreat of the glacial ice continued to modify the drainage structure of the region, allowing the reunification of all three basins (Superior, Michigan, and Huron) as the Nipissing Great Lakes. This arrangement was probably stable for more than 1,000 years, ending only when lake outlets other than the St. Clair River were cut off around 4,000 years ago. The current configuration of the lakes reflects the latest step in a long history of their post-glacial evolution.

== Bathymetry and hydrology ==
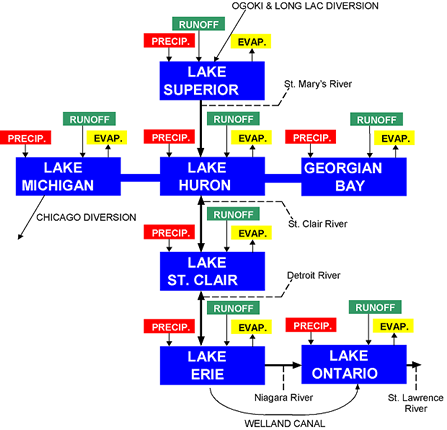
A NOAA schematic of the hydrology of the Great Lakes depicts Lake Michigan–Huron as a single lake with three basins: Lake Michigan, Lake Huron, and Georgian Bay.

The connection between Lake Michigan and Lake Huron through the Straits of Mackinac is 5 miles (8 km) wide and 120 feet (37 m) deep. This depth compares with the maximum depths of 750 feet (229 m) in Lake Huron and 923 feet (281 m) in Lake Michigan. Although the Straits create a pronounced bottleneck in the contours of the shoreline and a major constriction in the local bathymetry, defining two distinct basins, they are still deep and wide enough to allow the free exchange of water between the two sides. Because of the link through the Straits, Lakes Michigan and Huron have the same mean water level (in June 2015 it was 580 feet (177 m)).

The largest inflow to the system is the St. Mary's River from Lake Superior, and the main outflow is the St. Clair River toward Lake Erie; both lie in the Lake Huron basin. The combined effects of seiches (some being resonant standing waves) and of differing weather conditions (atmospheric pressure, wind) over each basin act to drive water either way through the Straits on a variety of characteristic timescales, at amounts sometimes exceeding 75,000 m^{3}/s (2,600,000 cu ft/s) for several hours in either direction. However, the long-term average flow through the Straits is eastwards at 1,500–2,000 m^{3}/s (53,000–71,000 cu ft/s), toward the outlet of the St. Clair River. Flows into the system from Lake Superior are controlled by the bi-national Lake Superior Board of Control through the operation of locks and canals.

== Constituent lakes ==
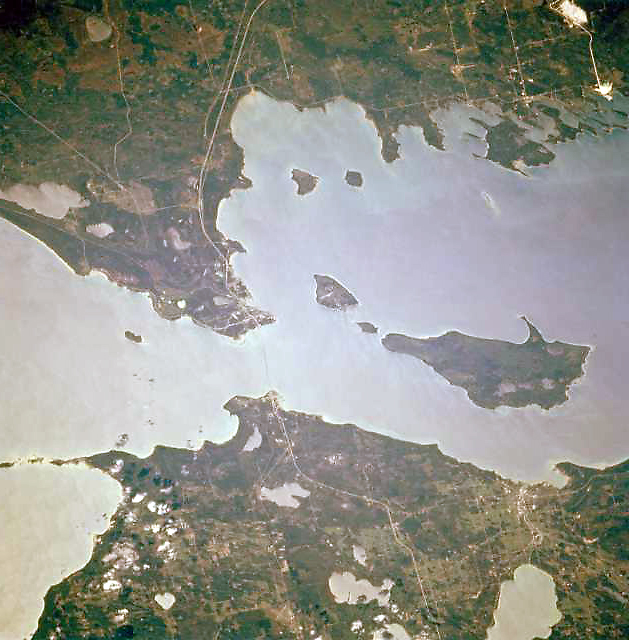
The overhead view of the Straits of Mackinac, which are 4 miles (6.4 kilometers) wide, and 295 feet (90 meters) deep. It links Lakes Michigan (left) and Huron (right).

Compared to the water basins it connects, the wide and deep Straits of Mackinac appear relatively small. Thus by historical naming convention, Lake Michigan and Lake Huron are usually considered distinct, e.g. in lists of the largest lakes in the world by area and volume. In the context of hydrology, however, the two are one body of water. Because of the hydrologic connectivity through the Straits, some sources consider the total area and volume of Lake Michigan–Huron when placing this system in a global or regional context.

When Lake Michigan–Huron is treated as a single entity, it is the largest freshwater lake by surface area in the world.

== See also ==
- List of lakes by area
- List of lakes by volume
- Michilimackinac
