= Ammerön =

Island in Sweden

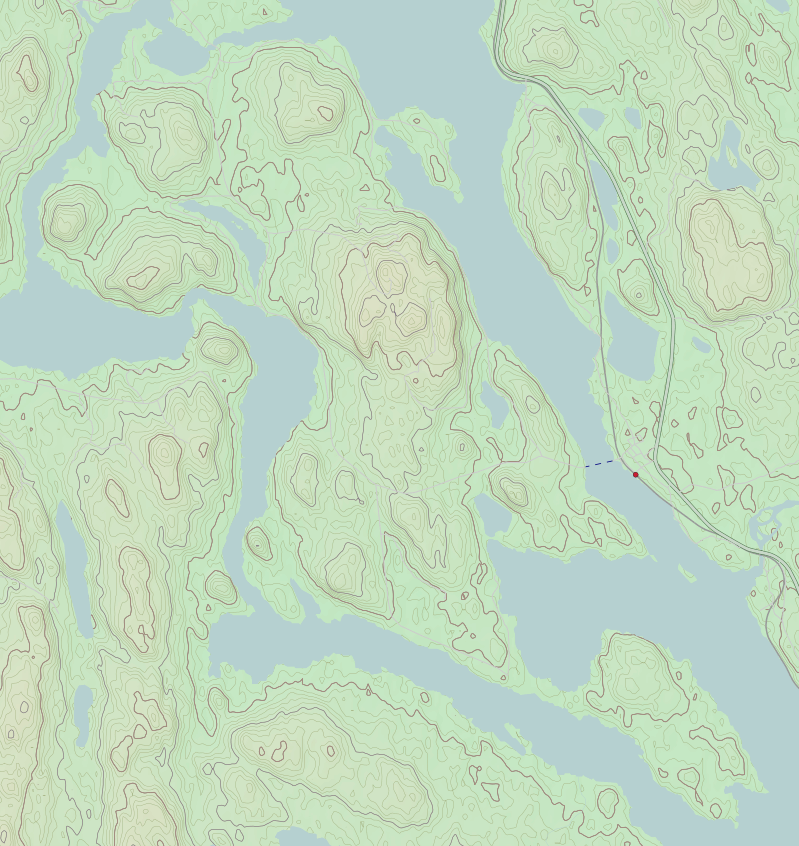

- Location within Sweden

Geography
- Location: Revsundssjön
- Coordinates: 62°50′50″N 15°12′50″E
- Area: 59.90 km^{2} (23.13 sq mi)

Administration
- Sweden
- County: Jämtland
- Municipality: Bräcke

Ammerön is the 19th biggest island in Sweden. It is located in the lake Revsundssjön.
