= Grand Lake (Newfoundland and Labrador) =

Lake in Newfoundland and Labrador, Canada

- Wli'Qospem (Mi'kmaq)
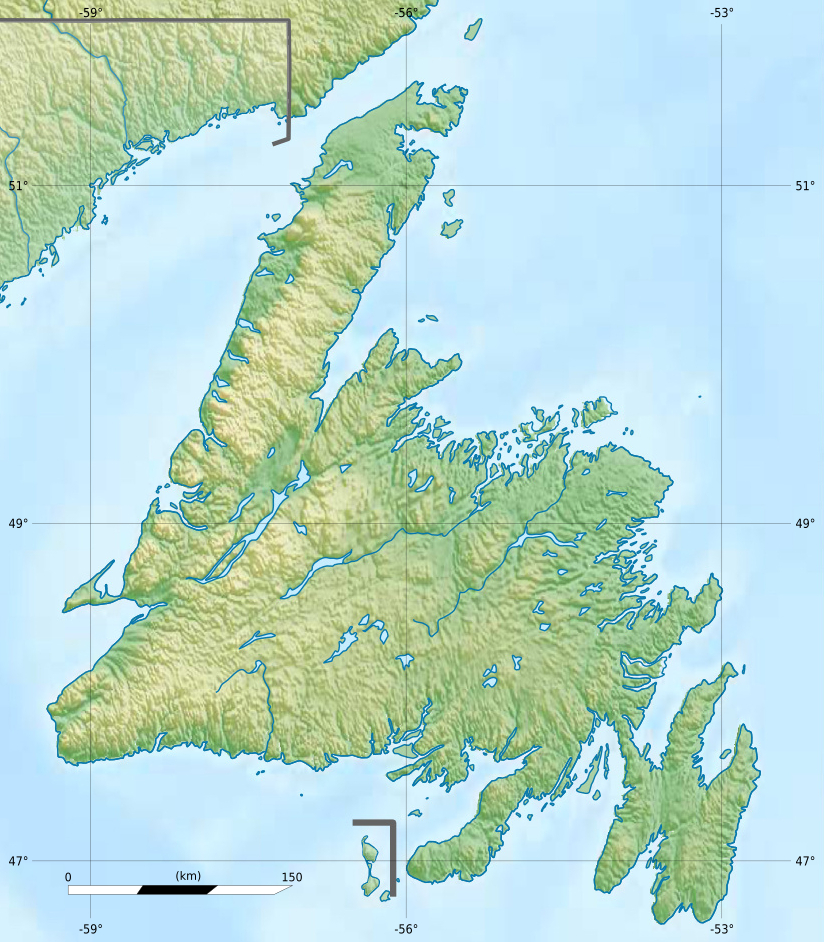
- Location in Newfoundland
- Location: Newfoundland, Canada
- Coordinates: 48°54′43″N 57°30′05″W
- Type: Natural Lake, Reservoir
- Primary inflows: Sandy Lake, Hinds Brook, Red Indian Brook, Lewaseechjeech Brook
- Primary outflows: Humber Canal (Man Made), Junction Brook (Dammed)
- Catchment area: 5,030 km^{2} (1,940 sq mi)
- Basin countries: Canada
- Max. length: 100 km (62 mi)
- Max. width: 10 km (6.2 mi)
- Surface area: 543 km^{2} (210 sq mi)
- Average depth: 50 m (160 ft)
- Max. depth: 300 m (980 ft)
- Water volume: 27.15 km^{3} (6.51 cu mi)
- Shore length^{1}: 283 km (176 mi)
- Surface elevation: 87 m (285 ft)
- Islands: Glover Island
- Settlements: Howley, NL
- ^{1} Shore length is not a well-defined measure.

Grand Lake is a large lake in the interior of the island of Newfoundland, in the Canadian province of Newfoundland and Labrador. It has an area of 543 km^{2} (210 sq mi), making it the largest lake on Newfoundland. Contained within the lake is the 18th largest lake-island in the world, Glover Island.

== History ==
The lake was flooded in 1924 with the construction of the Main Dam on Junction Brook, adding approximately 11 metres to the original lake depth. This elevation increase combined Grand Lake with Sandy Lake and Birchy Lake. With this, the lake also engulfed several smaller interconnected ponds and rivers such as Sandy Lake River (Main Brook).

== Geography ==
Today, the lake's surface elevation varies between 84 and 87.7 metres; it is highest immediately following snow melt in the spring and lowest just before the spring melt begins. It is located on the west side of Newfoundland, 24 km southeast of the city of Corner Brook. Fed by numerous small streams and brooks, it drains into Deer Lake via the 12 km long Humber Canal, and then via the Humber River, into the Bay of Islands. The lake contains the uninhabited Glover Island (178 km^{2}). Together with its feeder lakes, Sandy and Birchy, Grand Lake forms a waterway much used by recreational boaters.

== Usage ==
The lake serves as a reservoir for the hydro-electric generating station at Deer Lake, which was constructed to provide electricity to the pulp and paper mill at Corner Brook.

== See also ==
- List of lakes of Newfoundland and Labrador
