= Soisalo =

Largest island of Finland

Coordinates: 62°23′N 28°13′E

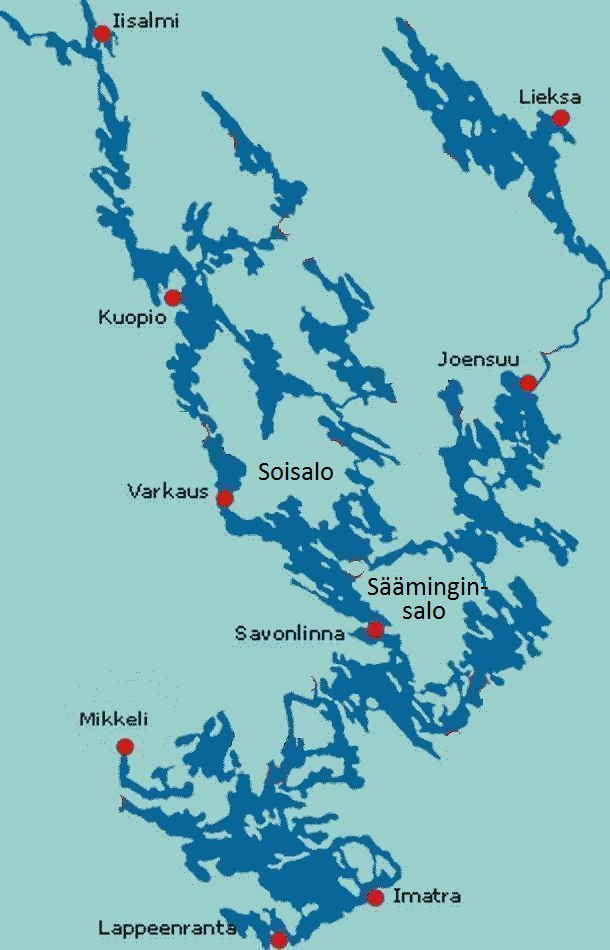
Map of the Lake Saimaa area

Soisalo (Finnish pronunciation: [ˈsoi̯ˌsɑlo]) is an area in central Finland, south of Kuopio. It is commonly regarded as the largest island of Finland. While it is an area of land surrounded by water (the lakes Kallavesi, Unnukka, Suvasvesi and Kermajärvi), as the lakes are narrow in places they are more like rivers.
