= Simpson Island =

Island in Ontario, Canada

- Interactive map of Simpson Island

Geography
- Location: Lake Superior
- Coordinates: 48°46′N 87°40′W
- Area: 73 km^{2} (28 sq mi)
- Length: 16 km (9.9 mi)
- Width: 10 km (6 mi)

Administration
- Canada
- Province: Ontario
- District: Thunder Bay

Demographics
- Population: uninhabited nature reserve

Simpson Island is an island in Lake Superior, situated off the north shore at the entrance to Nipigon Bay, in Northern Ontario, Canada. It is located about 5 km from the mainland and approximately 13 km southwest of the locality of Rossport. Simpson Island is 113 km northeast of the district capital, Thunder Bay, Ontario.

The fourth largest island in Lake Superior and the fifteenth largest in the Great Lakes, Simpson Island has an area of 73 km^{2}, and is 16 km long and 10 km wide. The island, which has been described as "rugged wilderness," is uninhabited, but is a destination for kayakers.

In the early 20th century its sandstone quarries supplied building stone to the cities of Port Arthur and Fort William, Ontario, and to cities in the United States.
