= Unnukka =

Lake in Leppävirta, Finland

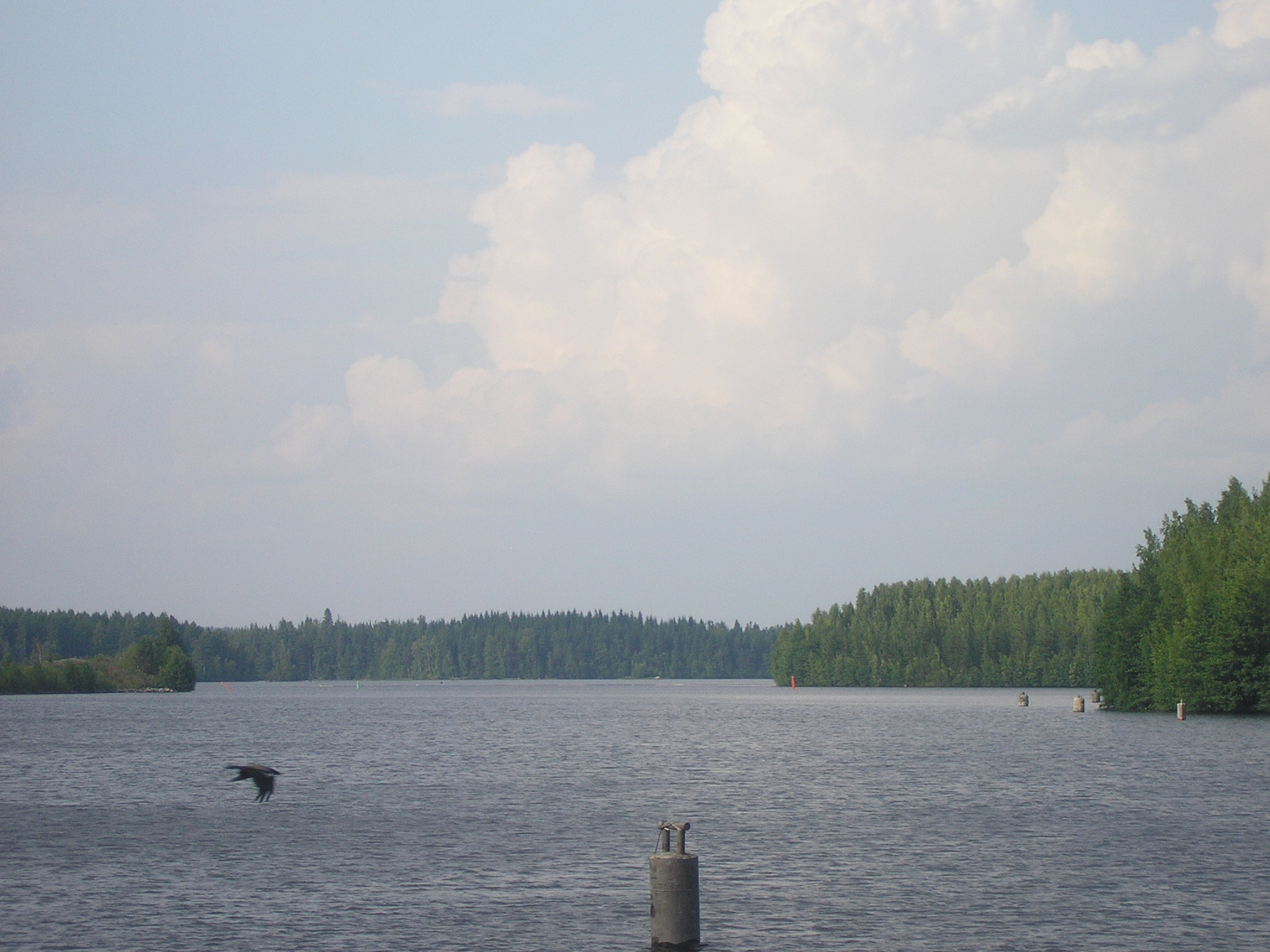

- Location within Finland
- Coordinates: 62°25′N 27°55′E
- Primary outflows: Ämmäkoski
- Catchment area: Vuoksi
- Basin countries: Finland
- Surface area: 80.451 km^{2} (31.062 sq mi)
- Average depth: 6.27 m (20.6 ft)
- Max. depth: 41.12 m (134.9 ft)
- Water volume: 0.504 km^{3} (409,000 acre⋅ft)
- Shore length^{1}: 478.34 km (297.23 mi)
- Surface elevation: 81.3 m (267 ft)
- Frozen: December–April
- Islands: Leppäsalo (over 10 km^{2}), Timonsalo, Tiheänsalo, Tervassalo, Pöyhönsaari ja Tanskansaari
- Settlements: Leppävirta, Varkaus
- ^{1} Shore length is not a well-defined measure.

Unnukka is a medium-sized lake in Southern Savonia region in Finland with dozens of big and little islands. It belongs to Vuoksi main catchment area. Unnukka's elevation is almost the same as the lake Savivesi's elevation, and it is possible to see them as one lake.

== See also ==
- List of lakes in Finland
