= Saimaa =

Largest lake in Finland and the fourth-largest in Europe

- Saimen
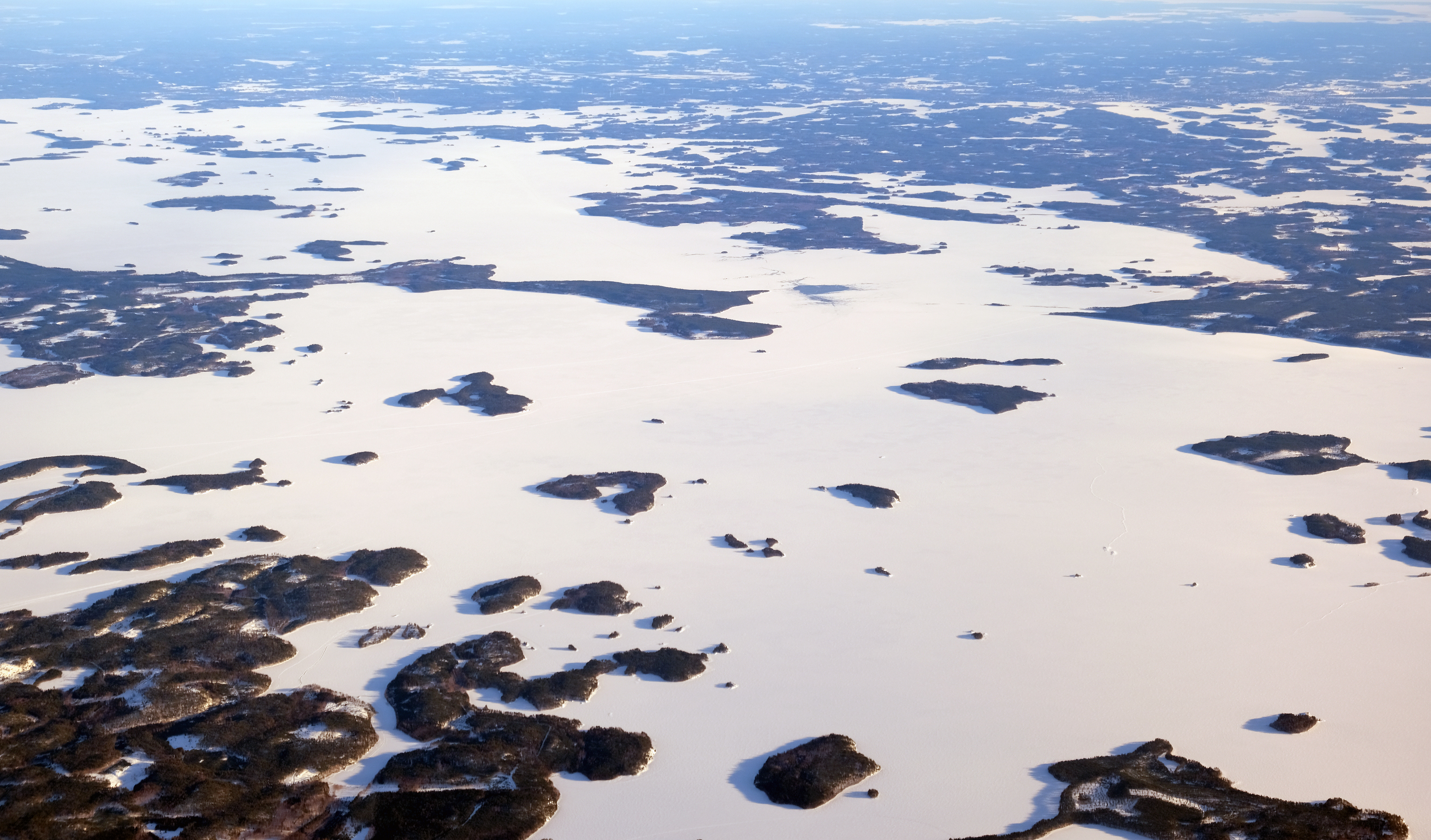
- Aerial view of frozen Lake Saimaa.

- Location within Finland
- Interactive map of Saimaa
- Location: southeastern Finland
- Coordinates: 61°15′N 028°15′E
- Primary outflows: Vuoksi River, Saimaa Canal
- Basin countries: Finland
- Surface area: 4,279 km^{2} (1,652 mi^{2})
- Average depth: 17 m (56 ft)
- Max. depth: 86 m (282 ft)
- Water volume: 36 km^{3} (8.6 cu mi)
- Shore length^{1}: 14,850 km (9,230 mi)
- Surface elevation: 76 m (249 ft)
- Islands: 13,710
- Settlements: Joensuu; Lappeenranta; Mikkeli; Savonlinna; Imatra; Varkaus
- ^{1} Shore length is not a well-defined measure.

Saimaa (/ˈsaɪmɑː/ SY-mah, Finnish: [ˈsɑi̯mɑː]; Swedish: Saimen) is a lake located in the Finnish Lakeland area in southeastern Finland. With a surface area of approximately 4,279 square kilometres (1,652 sq mi), it is the largest lake in Finland, and the fourth-largest natural freshwater lake in Europe.

The name Saimaa likely comes from a non-Uralic, non-Indo European substrate language. Alternatively, it has been proposed that the name may be connected to the Sami word sápmi.

== History ==
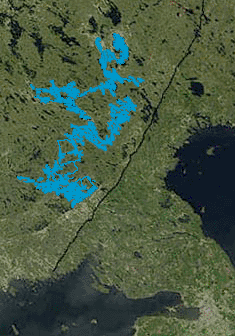
Saimaa highlighted on a satellite photo, Gulf of Finland at the bottom, Lake Ladoga on the right. The black line is the Russo-Finnish border.

The lake was formed by glacial melting at the end of the Ice Age. Major towns on the lakeshore include Lappeenranta, Imatra, Savonlinna, Mikkeli, Varkaus, and Joensuu. About 6,000 years ago, ancient Lake Saimaa, estimated to cover nearly 9,000 km^{2} (3,500 sq mi) at the time, was abruptly discharged through a new outlet. The event created thousands of square kilometres of new residual wetlands. Following this event, the region saw a population maximum in the decades following only to later return to an ecological development towards old boreal conifer forests which saw a decline in population.

== Topography ==
The Vuoksi River flows from Saimaa to Lake Ladoga. Most of the lake is dotted with islands, and narrow channels divide the lake into many parts, each having its own name (major basins include Orivesi, Puruvesi, Haukivesi, Yövesi, Pihlajavesi, and Pyhäselkä, among others). The southernmost major basin is sometimes called "Suur-Saimaa", or "Greater Saimaa", but this is not an official name.

Saimaa exhibits all major types of lake in Finland at different levels of eutrophication.

Finland's Ministry for Foreign Affairs describes the Saimaa basin (an area larger than the lake) as a "maze of detail": according to an English-language statement, the area includes 14,000 islands and "more shoreline here per unit of area than anywhere else in the world, the total length being nearly 15,000 kilometres (9,300 mi)."

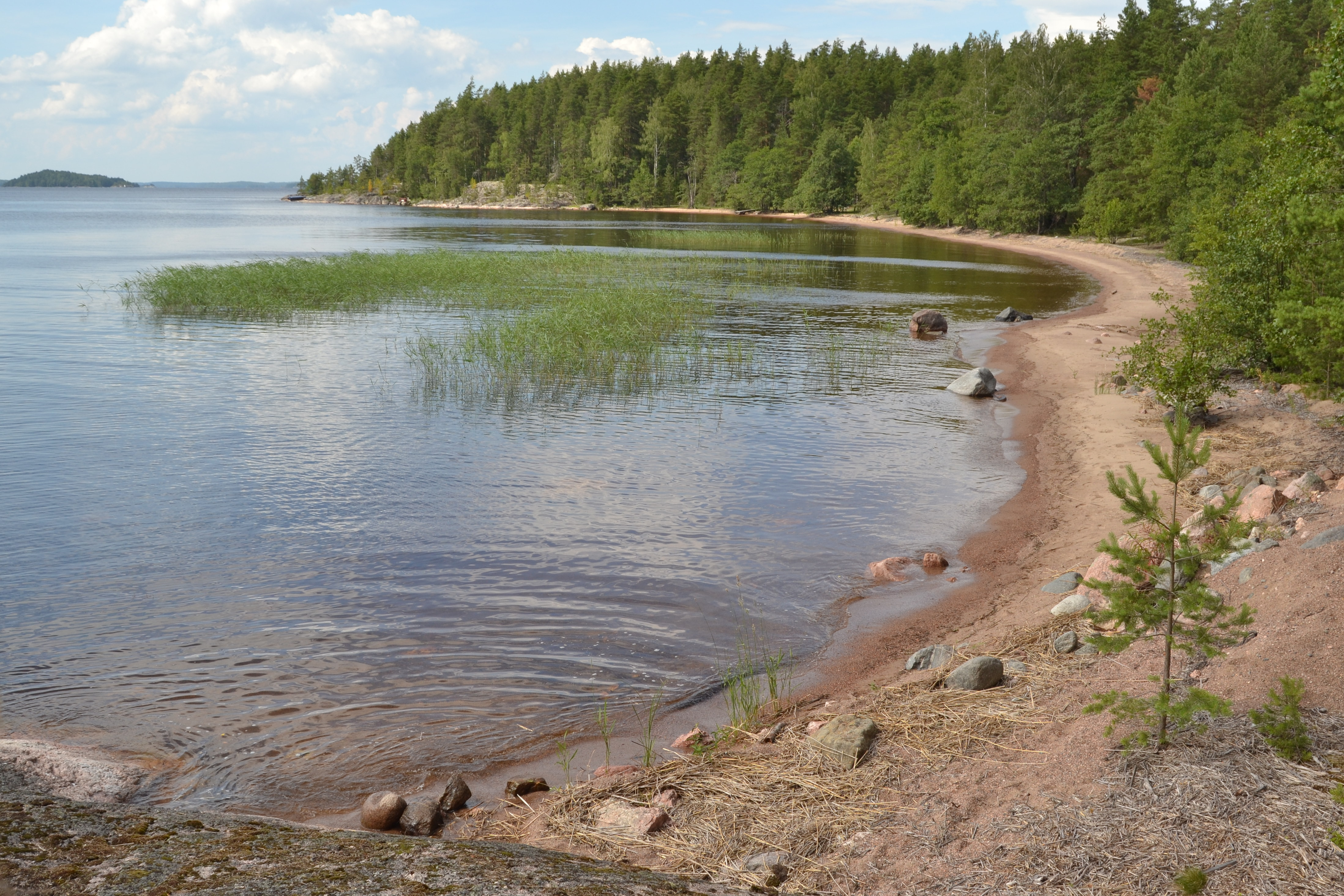
Hietasaari island on Lake Saimaa

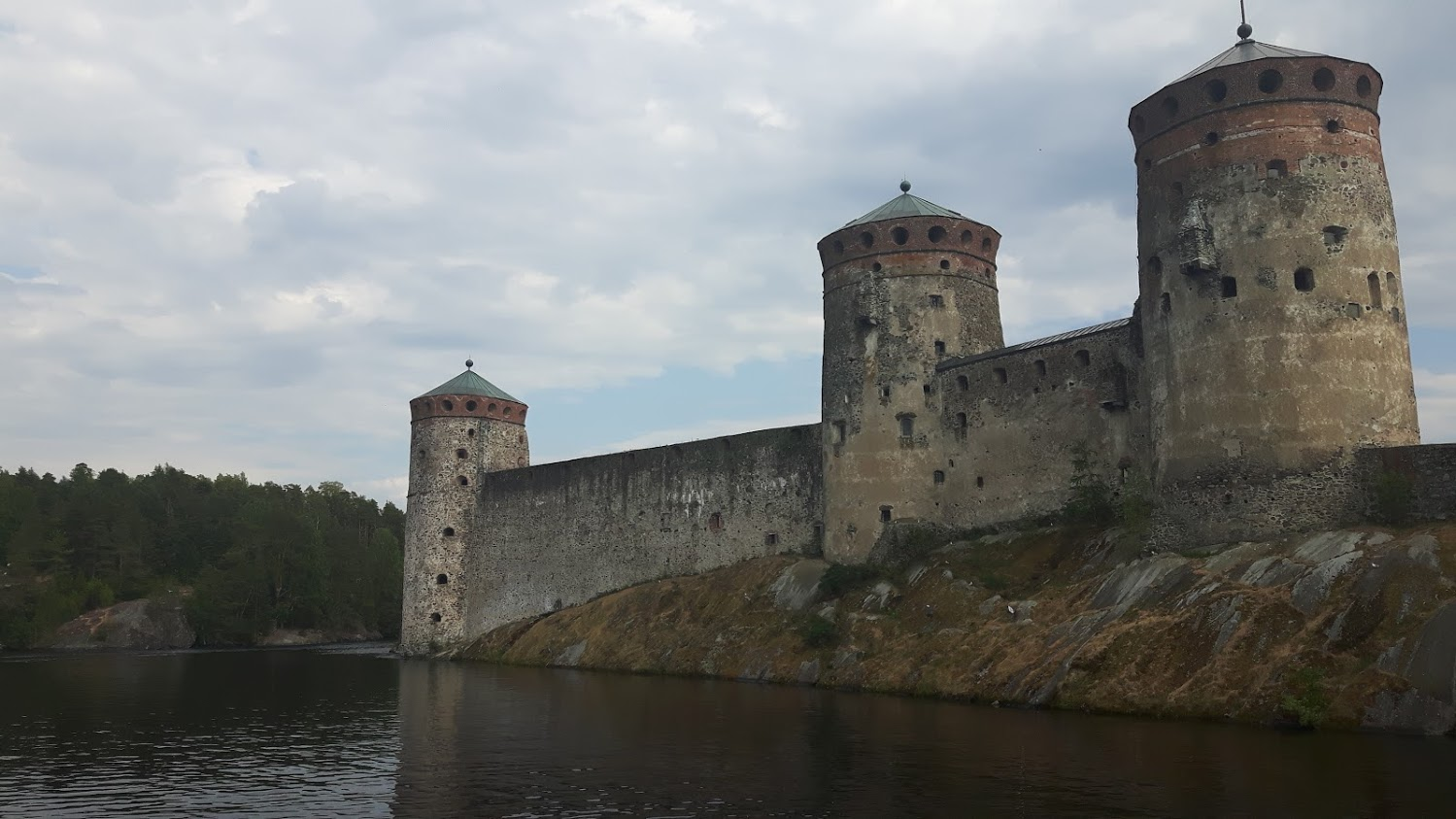
Olavinlinna fortress on Lake Saimaa

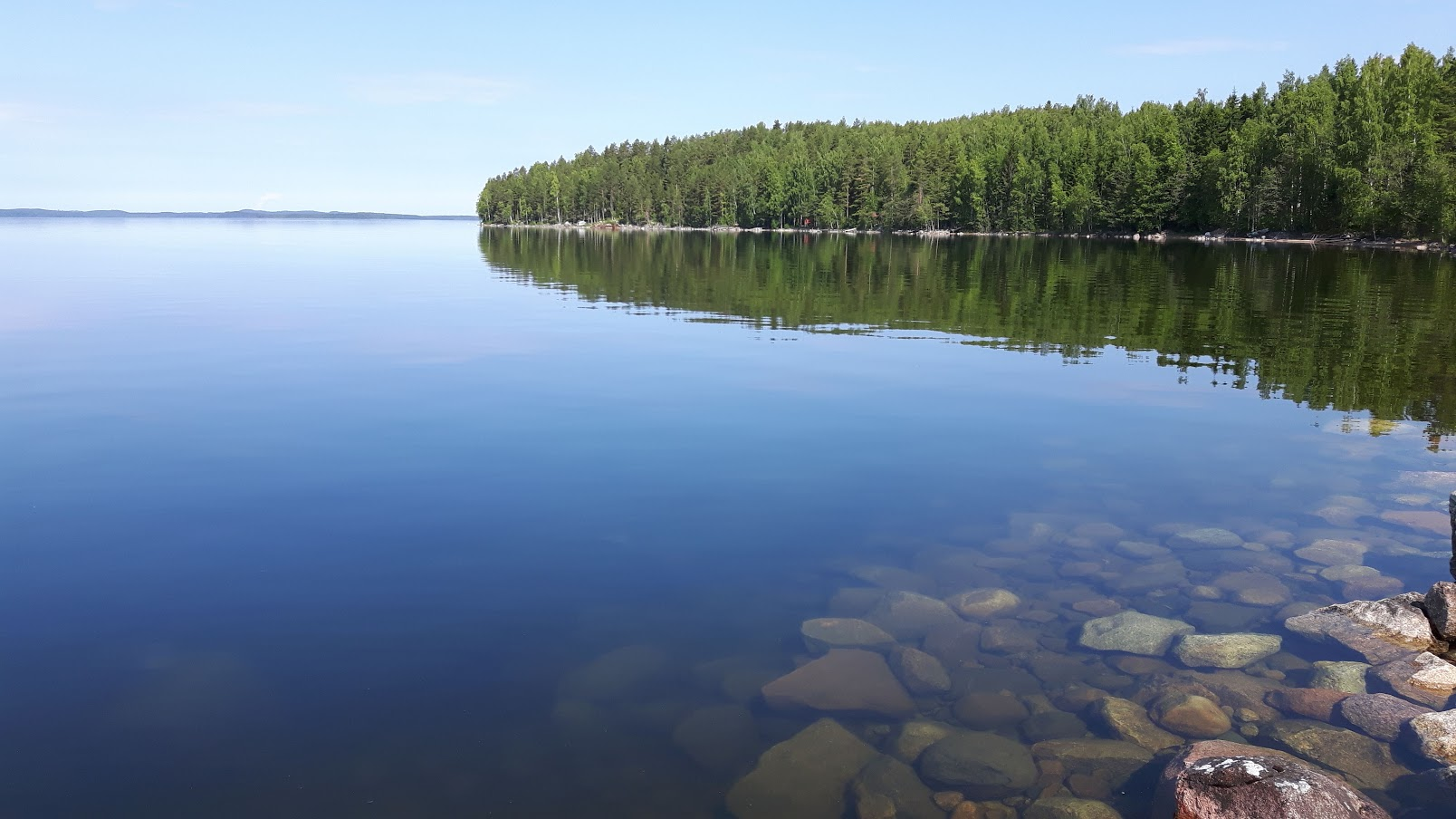
Lake Saimaa shoreline

== Natural resources ==
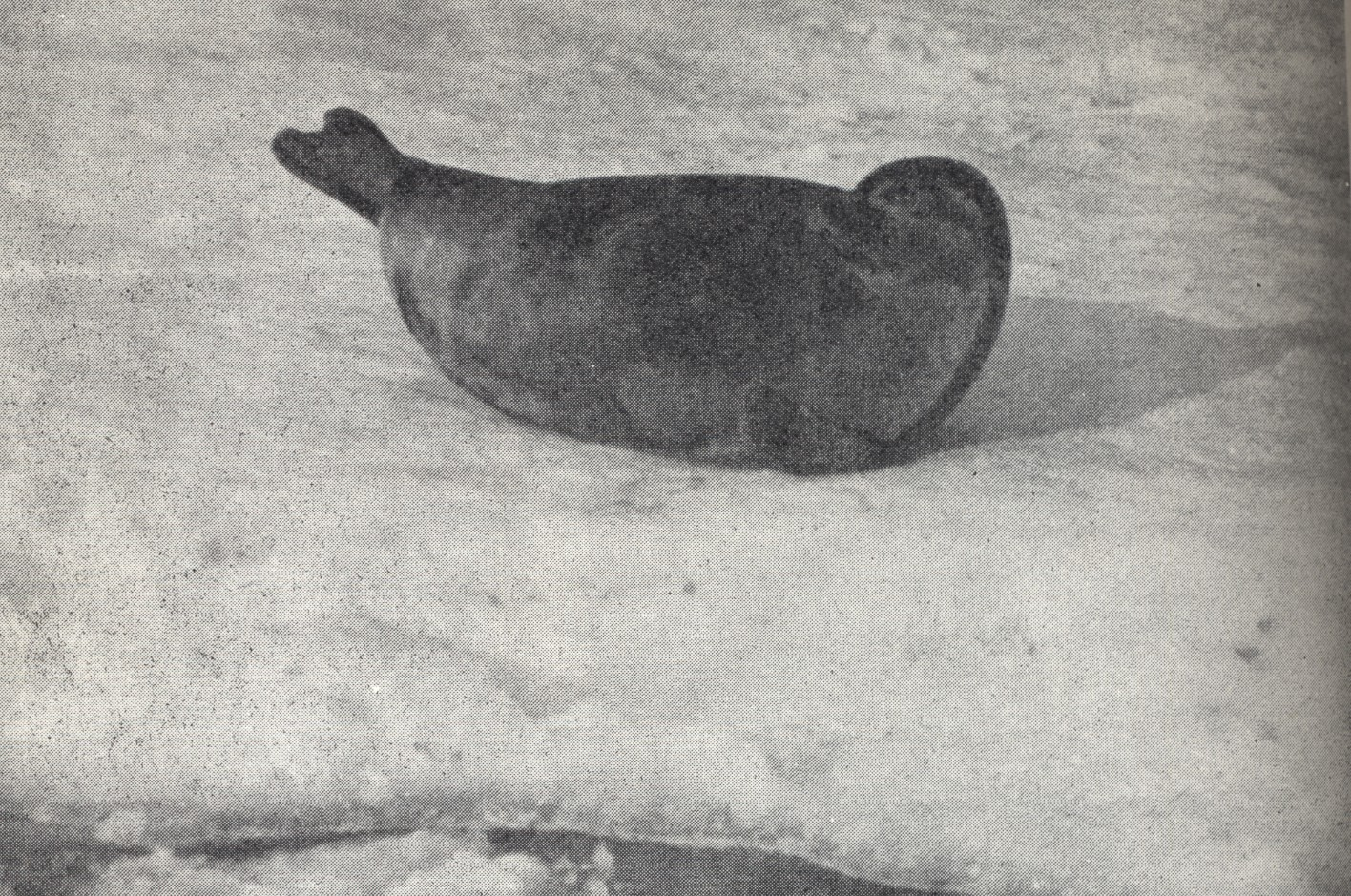
Pusa hispida saimensis, also known as Saimaa ringed seal, in 1956.

An endangered freshwater seal, the Saimaa ringed seal, lives only at Saimaa. Another of the lake's endangered species is the Saimaa salmon.

Due to its rich, easily accessible asbestos deposits, the shores of the lake are the most probable origin of asbestos-ceramic, a type of pottery made between c. 1900 BC – 200 AD.

== Tourism ==
The extreme heat waves that have plagued Europe for several years have given rise to the "coolcation" travel trend; in this context, publications such as National Geographic and El Mundo have highlighted Lake Saimaa as one of the most appealing destinations for travelers seeking to cool off.

The areas around Saimaa lake are a very popular location for summer cabins as well as lake cruises.

== Saimaa canal ==
The Saimaa Canal from Lauritsala (Lappeenranta) to Vyborg is 43 kilometres long and connects Saimaa to the Gulf of Finland. Nearly half of the Saimaa Canal runs through a land area leased from Russia. The canal’s eight locks are controlled from the remote control centres at Mälkiä and Brusnitchnoe. Other canals connect Saimaa to smaller lakes in Eastern Finland and form a network of waterways. These waterways are mainly used to transport wood, minerals, metals, pulp and other cargo, though tourists also use the waterways.

== Notable people ==
- The Russian writer Maxim Gorky went into exile near the shores of Lake Saimaa for a period of time after his apartment was raided by the Black Hundreds in the aftermath of the Moscow Uprising of 1905. He wrote to his divorced wife Ekaterina, writing "it's beautiful here, like a fairy tale".

== See also ==
- Lakes of Finland
- Soisalo
