= Pihlajavesi (Saimaa) =

Lake in the country of Finland

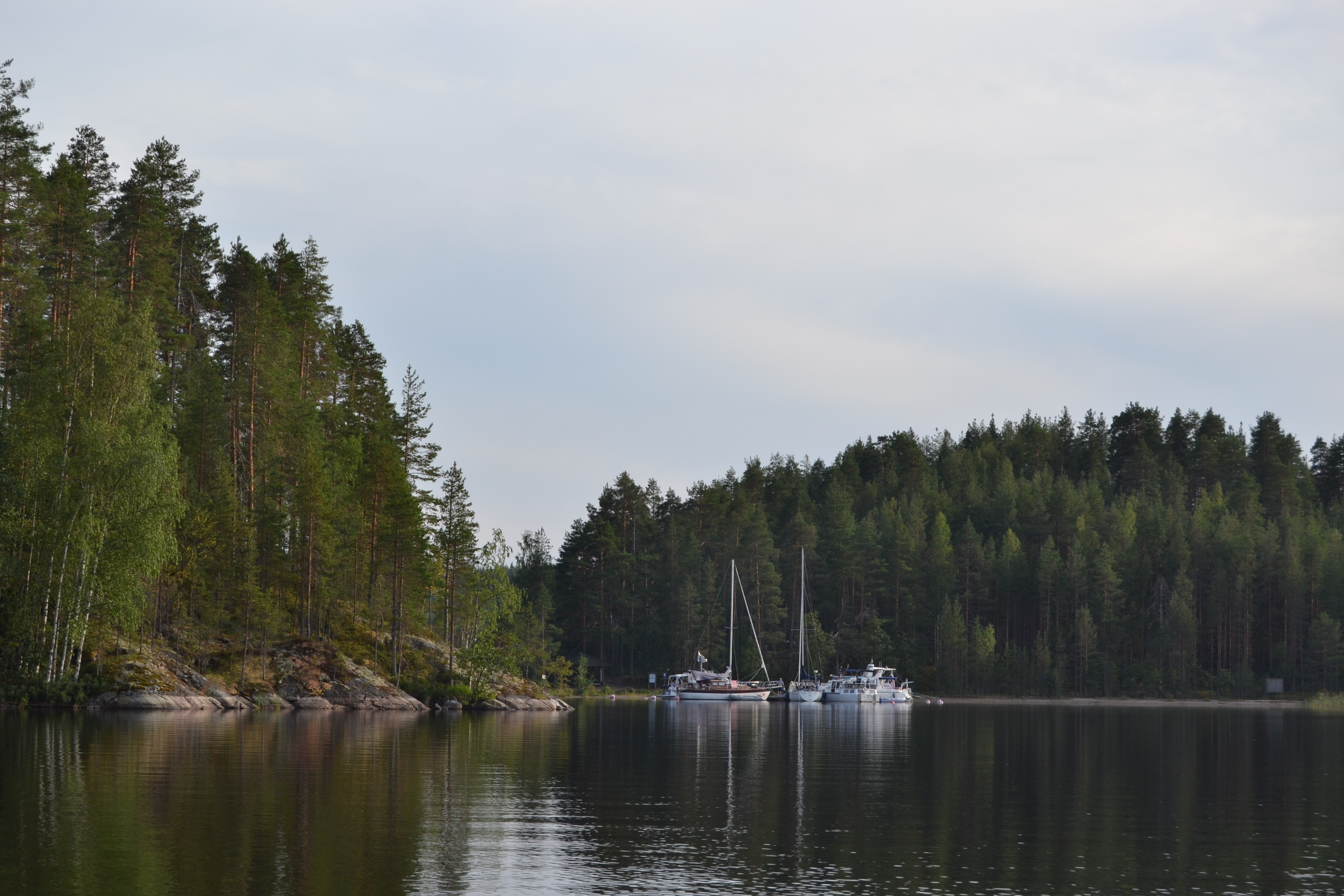
- Mitinhiekka, Pihlajavesi

- Location within Finland
- Coordinates: 61°43′N 028°53′E
- Basin countries: Finland
- Surface area: 712.59 km^{2} (275.13 sq mi)
- Average depth: 11.3 m (37 ft)
- Max. depth: 72 m (236 ft)
- Water volume: 18.08 km^{3} (14.66×10^{6} acre⋅ft)
- Shore length^{1}: 3,200 km (2,000 mi)
- Surface elevation: 75.7 m (248 ft)
- Settlements: Punkaharju, Savonlinna, Sulkava
- ^{1} Shore length is not a well-defined measure.

Pihlajavesi is a lake in Finland. The area of the lake is 712.59 square kilometres (275.13 sq mi) making it the sixth largest lake in the country. Pihlajavesi is the second-largest basin in the complex Saimaa lake system. Pihlajavesi lacks large open lake areas but has more islands than any other lake in Finland.

Pihlajavesi and the castle Olavinlinna on an island of it are regarded as a national landscape of Finland.

Part of the lake belongs to a namesake 45-km² nature reserve (created 2014) and Natura 2000 area (1998). There is a population of Saimaa seals in the lake. The area has infrastructure for visiting boaters. The purpose of the area is to protect the archipelago nature – including shores, woods and outcrop hills – and the Saimaa seal habitat, to maintain the traditional landscape, and to further outdoor life, teaching and research.
