= List of European islands by area =

This is a list of islands in Europe ordered by area.

== Islands over 200 km^{2} ==
Rank	Island	Area (km^{2})	Area (sq mi)	Countries/regions	Notes
-	Greenland	2,130,800	822,700	Denmark (Greenland)	Largest island in the world. Geographically North American, culturally European.
1	Great Britain	229,048	88,745	United Kingdom (England, Scotland, Wales)	Largest island in geographical Europe. Largest island of the United Kingdom (93% of the state area)
2	Iceland	101,826	39,315	Iceland	Largest island of Iceland (99% of the state area)
3	Ireland	84,421	32,595	Republic of Ireland, United Kingdom (Northern Ireland)	
4	Severny Island	47,079	18,177	Russia	Northern Island of Novaya Zemlya. Largest island of Russia within Europe.
5	Spitsbergen	37,673	14,546	Norway (Svalbard)	Largest island of Svalbard (62% of its entire area) and of Norway.
6	Yuzhny Island	33,246	12,836	Russia	Southern Island of Novaya Zemlya.
7	Sicily	25,662	9,908	Italy	Largest island of Italy, largest island of the Mediterranean Sea.
8	Sardinia	24,099	9,305	Italy	
9	Nordaustlandet	14,443	5,576	Norway (Svalbard)	
-	Cyprus	9,251	3,572	Cyprus; United Kingdom (Akrotiri and Dhekelia)	Subject to ongoing territorial dispute between the Republic of Cyprus and Northern Cyprus. Culturally European, geographically Asian.
10	Corsica	8,741	3,351	France	Largest island of France within Europe.
11	Crete	8,312	3,209	Greece	Largest island of Greece.
12	Zealand	7,180	2,715	Denmark	Largest island of Denmark within Europe.
13	Edgeøya	5,074	1,959	Norway (Svalbard)	
14	Vendsyssel-Thy	4,685	1,809	Denmark	
15	Euboea	3,655	1,411	Greece	
16	Mallorca	3,640	1,406	Spain	Largest island of Spain within Europe.
17	Kolguyev	3,497	1,350	Russia	
18	Vaygach Island	3,329	1,306	Russia	
19	Gotland	2,994	1,156	Sweden	Largest island of Sweden. Largest island in the Baltic Sea.
20	Fyn	2,984	1,152	Denmark	
21	Zemlya Georga	2,821	1,089	Russia	
22	Saaremaa	2,672	1,032	Estonia	Largest island of Estonia.
23	Wilczek Land	2,203	851	Russia	
24	Hinnøya	2,198	849	Norway	
25	Lewis and Harris	2,179	841	United Kingdom (Scotland)	
-	Tenerife	2,034	785	Spain	Largest in the Canary Islands. Culturally European, geographically African.
26	Žitný ostrov	1,900	730	Slovakia	Largest river island in Europe
-	Fuerteventura	1,660	641	Spain	Canary Islands. Culturally European, geographically African.
27	Skye	1,656	639	United Kingdom (Scotland)	
28	Soisalo	1,638	631	Finland	Largest island of Finland. Largest freshwater island of Europe.
29	Lesbos	1,630	629	Greece	
30	Senja	1,586	612	Norway	
-	Gran Canaria	1,560	602	Spain	Canary Islands. Culturally European, geographically African.
31	Graham Bell Island	1,557	601	Russia	
32	Rhodes	1,398	540	Greece	
33	Öland	1,347	520	Sweden	
34	Barents Island	1,288	497	Norway (Svalbard)	
35	Lolland	1,243	480	Denmark	
36	Södertörn	1,207	466	Sweden	
37	Zemlya Aleksandry	1,095	423	Russia	
38	Gallya	1,049	405	Russia	
39	Hiiumaa	989	382	Estonia	
40	Mainland, Shetland	969	374	United Kingdom (Scotland)	Mainland of the Shetland Islands.
41	Salisbury Island	960	371	Russia	
42	Rügen	926	358	Germany	Largest island of Germany.
43	Isle of Mull	875	338	United Kingdom (Scotland)	
44	Langøya	850	328	Norway	
-	Lanzarote	846	327	Spain	Canary Islands. Culturally European, geographically African.
45	Chios	842	324	Greece	
46	Sørøya	811	313	Norway	
47	Kefalonia	781	301	Greece	
48	São Miguel Island	759	293	Portugal	Largest island of Portugal.
49	Mezhdusharskiy Island	748	288	Russia	
-	Madeira Island	741	286	Portugal	Politically part of Europe; geographically nearer to Africa.
50	Kvaløya (in Troms)	737	284	Norway	
51	Anglesey	714	276	United Kingdom (Wales)	Includes Holy Island, Anglesey- 15.22 sq mi (39.4 km^{2}) - separated by a very narrow channel.
-	La Palma	708	273	Spain	Canary Islands. Culturally European, geographically African.
52	Menorca	694	268	Spain	
53	Fasta Åland	685	265	Finland (Åland)	Mainland of Åland.
54	Kvitøya	682	264	Norway (Svalbard)	
55	Ringvassøya	656	253	Norway	
56	Islay	620	239	United Kingdom (Scotland)	
57	Prins Karls Forland	615	237	Norway (Svalbard)	
58	MacKlintok Island	612	236	Russia	
59	Corfu	592	229	Greece	
60	Bornholm	588	227	Denmark	
61	Hitra	572	221	Norway	
62	Isle of Man	572	221	Isle of Man	Crown Dependencies
63	Ibiza	571	220	Spain	
64	Seiland	559	216	Norway	
65	Austvågøya	527	203	Norway	
66	Kimitoön (Finnish: Kemiönsaari)	524	202	Finland	
67	Mainland, Orkney	523	202	United Kingdom (Scotland)	Mainland of the Orkney Islands.
68	Jackson Island	521	201	Russia	
69	Falster	514	199	Denmark	
70	Andøya	489	189	Norway	
71	La Ronciere Island	478	185	Russia	
72	Samos	476	184	Greece	
73	Lemnos	476	184	Greece	
74	Hooker Island	460	177	Russia	
75	Ziegler Island	448	173	Russia	
76	Pico Island	446	172	Portugal	
77	Usedom	445	172	Germany; Poland	
78	Magerøya	437	169	Norway	
79	Isle of Arran	432	167	United Kingdom (Scotland)	
80	Naxos	428	165	Greece	
81	Vestvågøya	411	159	Norway	
82	Zakynthos	406	158	Greece	
83	Krk	406	158	Croatia	Largest island of Croatia.
84	Cres	406	158	Croatia	Just 0.02 km^{2} smaller than Krk.
85	Terceira Island	403	156	Portugal	
86	Brač	395	153	Croatia	
87	Isle of Wight	381	147	United Kingdom (England)	
88	Jan Mayen	380	147	Norway	
89	Andros	380	147	Greece	
90	Thasos	379	146	Greece	
91	Szigetköz	375	145	Hungary	
92	Champ Island	374	144	Russia	
93	Streymoy	374	144	Denmark (Faroe Islands)	
94	Luigi Island	371	143	Russia	
-	La Gomera	370	142	Spain	Canary Islands. Culturally European, geographically African.
95	Mors	368	142	Denmark	
96	Jura	367	142	United Kingdom (Scotland)	
97	Orust	346	133	Sweden	
98	Salm Island	344	133	Russia	
99	Kvaløya	336	129	Norway	
100	Karl-Alexander Island	329	127	Russia	
101	Osterøy	329	127	Norway	
102	Als	321	125	Denmark	
103	South Uist	320	124	United Kingdom (Scotland)	
104	Leucas	303	117	Greece	
105	North Uist	303	117	United Kingdom (Scotland)	
106	Karpathos	301	300	Greece	
107	Hvar	300	116	Croatia	
108	Rudolf Island	296	114	Russia	
109	Kos	290	112	Greece	
110	Northbrook Island	289	111	Russia	
111	Yeva-Liv Island	288	110	Russia	
112	Eysturoy	286	110	Denmark (Faroe Islands)	
113	Pag	285	109	Croatia	
114	Langeland	284	109	Denmark	
115	Imbros	279	108	Turkey	Largest island of Turkey within Europe.
116	Cythera	278	107	Greece	
117	Korčula	276	107	Croatia	
118	Arnøya	276	107	Norway	
-	El Hierro	268.5	193	Spain	Canary Islands. Culturally European, geographically African.
119	Wolin	265	103	Poland	
120	Icaria	255	98	Greece	
121	Bolshoy Solovetsky Island	246	95	Russia	Mainland of Solovetsky Islands.
122	Malta	246	95	Malta	Largest island of Malta (78% of the state area)
123	São Jorge Island	246	95	Portugal	
124	Stord	241	93	Norway	
125	Wiener Neustadt Island	237	91	Russia	
126	Vanna (Troms)	232	90	Norway	
127	Stjernøya	231	90	Norway	
128	Møn	226	88	Denmark	
129	Elba	224	86	Italy	
130	Smøla	218	84	Norway	
131	Yell	212	82	United Kingdom (Scotland)	
132	Skyros	209	81	Greece	
133	Muhu	206	80	Estonia	

== Islands 100–200 km^{2} ==
Rank	Island	Area (km^{2})	Area (sq mi)	Country/Countries/Region
134	Hisingen	199	77	Sweden
135	Tysnesøy	198	77	Norway
136	Hailuoto	195	75	Finland
137	Tinos	195	75	Greece
138	Paros	194	74	Greece
139	Bruce Island	191	73	Russia
140	Kongsøya	191	73	Norway (Svalbard)
141	Oléron	190	73	France
142	Tjeldøya	187	72	Norway
143	Moskenesøya	186	72	Norway
144	Fehmarn	185	71	Germany
145	Värmdön	181	70	Sweden
146	Bear Island (Bjørnøya)	178	69	Norway (Svalbard)
147	Samothrace	178	69	Greece
148	Karmøy	177	68	Norway
149	Sotra	176	68	Norway
150	Vágar	176	68	Denmark (Faroe Islands)
151	Faial Island	173	67	Portugal
152	Bømlo	171	66	Norway
153	Texel	170	66	Netherlands
154	Hareidlandet	166	64	Norway
155	Averøya	165	64	Norway
156	Nansen Island	164	63	Russia
157	Suðuroy	163	63	Denmark (Faroe Islands)
158	Vega	163	63	Norway
159	Payer Island	160	62	Russia
160	Replot (Raippaluoto)	160	62	Finland
161	Bremangerlandet	153	59	Norway
162	Alsta	153	59	Norway
163	Milos	151	58	Greece
164	Achill	148	57	Republic of Ireland
165	Tjörn-Mjörn	148	57	Sweden
166	Frøya	147	57	Norway
167	Reinøya	147	57	Norway
168	Flores Island	143	55	Portugal
169	Hoy	143	55	United Kingdom (Scotland)
170	Otterøya	143	55	Norway
171	Ertvågsøya	140	54	Norway
172	Rainer Island	140	54	Russia
173	Gurskøya	139	53	Norway
174	Svenskøya	137	53	Norway (Svalbard)
175	Andørja	135	52	Norway
176	Dønna	135	52	Norway
177	Föglö	132	52	Finland (Åland)
178	Heiss Island	132	52	Russia
179	Kea	131	51	Greece
180	Skogerøya	129	50	Norway
181	Rømø	129	50	Denmark
182	Väddö	128	49	Sweden
183	Greely Island	127	49	Russia
184	Sandoy	125	48	Denmark (Faroe Islands)
185	Bute	122	47	United Kingdom (Scotland)
186	Amorgos	121	47	Greece
187	Unst	121	47	United Kingdom (Scotland)
188	Wilhelm Island	120	47	Norway (Svalbard)
189	Jersey	119	45	Crown Dependencies ( Jersey)
190	Læsø	116	45	Denmark
191	Sula	116	45	Norway
192	Dugi Otok	114	44	Croatia
193	Samsø	114	44	Denmark
194	Fårö	113	44	Sweden
195	Marmara Island	113	44	Turkey
196	Arthur Island	111	43	Russia
197	Kalymnos	111	43	Greece
198	Flakstadøya	110	42	Norway
199	Morzhovets Island	110	42	Russia
200	Grytøya	108	41	Norway
201	Ios	108	41	Greece
202	Sant'Antioco	108	41	Italy
203	Rolla (Troms)	107	41	Norway
204	Dolgy Island	106	41	Russia
205	Otava	105	40	Finland
206	Rùm	105	40	United Kingdom (Scotland)
207	Lågøya	104	40	Norway (Svalbard)
208	Brändö	103	40	Finland (Åland)
209	Radøy	103	40	Norway
210	Sandhornøya	103	40	Norway
211	Hadseløya	102	39	Norway
212	Vårdö	102	39	Finland (Åland)

== Islands 50–100 km^{2} ==
Data for some islands is missing, particularly for some Arctic islands in Russia and Svalbard.

Rank	Island	Area (km^{2})	Area (sq mi)	Country/Countries/Region
213	Mljet	100	39	Croatia
214	Kythnos	99	38	Greece
215	Sylt	99	38	Germany
216	Askøy	99	38	Norway
217	Inner-Vikna	99	38	Norway
218	Santa Maria Island	97	37	Portugal
219	Astypalaia	97	38	Greece
220	Amager	96	37	Denmark
221	Ithaki	96	37	Greece
222	Borðoy	95	37	Denmark (Faroe Islands)
223	Salamis	95	37	Greece
224	Skopelos	95	37	Greece
225	Selaön	95	37	Sweden
226	Sheppey	94	36	United Kingdom (England)
227	Gräsö	93	36	Sweden
228	Lemland	92	36	Finland (Åland)
229	Vormsi	92	36	Estonia
230	Rab	91	36	Croatia
231	Eckerö	91	36	Finland (Åland)
232	Öja	90	35	Finland
233	Vis	90	35	Croatia
234	Rolvsøya	89	34	Norway
235	Tustna	89	34	Norway
236	Austra	88	34	Norway
237	Holsnøy	88	34	Norway
238	Terschelling	88	34	Netherlands
239	Ærø	88	34	Denmark
240	Belle Île	87	34	France
241	Mykonos	86	34	Greece
242	Kågen	86	33	Norway
243	Île de Ré	85	33	France
244	Nordkvaløya	84	33	Norway
245	Syros	84	33	Greece
246	Aegina	83	32	Greece
247	Formentera	83	32	Spain
248	Pantelleria	83	32	Italy
249	Ytter-Vikna	83	32	Norway
250	Benbecula	82	32	United Kingdom (Scotland)
251	Rebbenesøya	82	32	Norway
252	Föhr	82	32	Germany
253	Färingsö	82	32	Sweden
254	Tiree	78	30	United Kingdom (Scotland)
255	Uløya	78	30	Norway
256	Coll	77	30	United Kingdom (Scotland)
257	Otrøya	76	29	Norway
258	Santorini	76	29	Greece
259	Lošinj	75	29	Croatia
260	Hertsön	73	28	Sweden
261	Serifos	73	29	Greece
262	Sifnos	73	29	Greece
263	Storlandet (Iso-Nauvo) (Nagu/Nauvo main island)	72	29	Finland
264	Tåsinge	70	27	Denmark
265	Ålön (in Pargas/Parainen)	70	27	Finland
266	Engeløya	68	26	Norway
267	Finnøya	68	26	Norway
268	Alnön	68	26	Sweden
269	Gozo	67	26	Malta
270	Ekerön	67	26	Sweden
271	Kasos	66	26	Greece
272	Tosterön	66	26	Sweden
273	Kyrklandet (in Korpo/Korppoo)	64	25	Finland
274	Alonissos	64	25	Greece
275	Vågsøy	64	25	Norway
276	Frei	63	24	Norway
277	Guernsey	63	24	Crown Dependencies ( Guernsey)
278	Ingarö	63	24	Sweden
279	Pašman	63	24	Croatia
280	Tilos	63	24	Greece
281	Raasay	62	24	United Kingdom
282	Graciosa	62	24	Portugal
283	Ljusterö	62	24	Sweden
284	Torsö	62	24	Sweden
285	Bolshoy Berezovy (in Beryozovye Islands, Gulf of Finland)	60	23	Russia
286	Leka	60	23	Norway
287	Ammerön	60	23	Sweden
288	Sula (in Møre og Romsdal)	59	23	Norway
289	Barra	59	23	United Kingdom (Scotland)
290	Šolta	59	23	Croatia
291	Ombo	58	22	Norway
292	Ameland	58	22	Netherlands
293	Symi	58	22	Greece
294	Kivimaa (in Kustavi/Gustavs)	57	22	Finland
295	Fanø	56	21.5	Denmark
296	Dzharylhach	56	21.5	Ukraine
297	Jøa	55	21	Norway
298	Hemsön	54	21	Sweden
299	Dyrøya	53	20	Norway
300	Leros	53	20	Greece
301	Pyhämaa (in Uusikaupunki/Nystad)	53	20	Finland
302	Vessölandet (in Porvoo/Borgå)	52	20	Finland
303	Mörkö	52	20	Sweden
304	Isola Maddalena (containing La Maddalena)	52	20	Italy
305	San Pietro Island	51	20	Italy
306	Asinara	51	20	Italy
307	Hydra	50	19	Greece
308	Sanday, Orkney	50	19	United Kingdom (Scotland)
309	Ugljan	50	19	Croatia
310	Huftarøy	50	19	Norway
311	Storøya	50	19	Norway (Svalbard)
312	Wahlbergøya	50	19	Norway (Svalbard)
313	South Ronaldsay	50	19	United Kingdom (Scotland)
314	Pitholmen	50	19	Sweden

== Islands 20–50 km^{2} ==
Island	Area (km^{2})	Area (sq mi)	Country
Île de Noirmoutier	49	19	France
Kirjalaön (Kirjalansaari) (in Pargas/Parainen)	49	19	Finland
Rousay	49	19	United Kingdom (Scotland)
Silda	48	19	Norway
Skiathos	48	19	Greece
Anzersky Island	47	18	Russia
Hopen	47	18	Norway (Svalbard)
Lastovo	47	18	Croatia
Tomma	47	18	Norway
Westray	47	18	United Kingdom (Scotland)
Gossa	46.5	17.5	Norway
Gimsøya	46	17	Norway
Ischia	46	17	Italy
Oxkungar/Tengmo	46	17	Finland
Varaldsøy	45.5	17	Norway
Rusnė Island	45	17	Lithuania
Nøtterøy	43.5	17	Norway
Agios Efstratios	43.2	16	Greece
Helgøya	43	16	Norway
Porto Santo Island	42.27	16.32	Portugal
Hämön	42	16	Sweden
Nisyros	41.4	16	Greece
Belene Island	41	16	Bulgaria
Colonsay	41	16	United Kingdom (Scotland)
Fetlar	41	16	United Kingdom (Scotland)
Schiermonnikoog	41	16	Netherlands
Sikinos	41	16	Greece
Rennesøy	41	16	Norway
Danes Island	40.6	15.7	Norway (Svalbard)
Viðoy	40.4	15.6	Denmark (Faroe Islands)
Psara	40	15.5	Greece
Vlieland	40	15.5	Netherlands
Holy Island, Anglesey	39.4	15	United Kingdom (Wales)
Hjelmsøya	39	15	Norway
Härnön	39	15	Sweden
Anafi	38	15	Greece
Lillandet (in Nagu/Nauvo)	38	15	Finland
Elvalandet	38	15	Norway
Halsnøya	38	15	Norway
Atløy	37.5	15	Norway
Lipari	37.5	15	Italy
Larsmo	37	14.5	Finland
Pellworm	37	14.5	Germany
Reksteren	37	14.5	Norway
Stortervolandet (Iso-Tervo) (in Pargas/Parainen)	37	14.5	Finland
Tenedos	36	14	Turkey
Gotska Sandön	36	14	Sweden
Kaurissalo (in Kustavi/Gustavs)	36	14	Finland
Kimolos	36	14	Greece
Laukøya	36	14	Norway
Poel	36	14	Germany
Vestre Bokn (Western Bokn Island)	36	14	Norway
Stabblandet	36	14	Norway
Kunoy	35.1	13.5	Denmark (Faroe Islands)
Antiparos	35	13	Greece
Stormolla	35	13	Norway
Emäsalo (Swedish: Emsalö)	34	13	Finland
Handnesøya	34	13	Norway
Lemlahdensaari (Swedish: Lemlaxön)	34	13	Finland
Patmos	34	13	Greece
Sobieszewo Island	34	13	Poland
Vätö	34	13	Sweden
Ytre Sula	34	13	Norway
Lumparland	33	12.5	Finland (Åland)
Stronsay	33	12.5	United Kingdom (Scotland)
Skogsøya	32.5	12	Norway
Kornati	32	19	Croatia
Björkö (Korsholm)	32	12	Finland
Folegandros	32	12	Greece
Husøy (in Solund Municipality)	32	12	Norway
Mellom-Vikna (central island of Vikna archipelago)	32	12	Norway
Sandøyna	32	12	Norway
Borkum	31	12	Germany
Fournoi	31	12	Greece
Huvudlandet (in Houtskär/Houtskari)	31	12	Finland
Vartsala (in Kustavi/Gustavs)	31	12	Finland
Inishmore	30.9	12	Republic of Ireland
Landegode	30.5	12	Norway
Kalsoy	30.4	11.7	Denmark (Faroe Islands)
Eigg	30	11.5	United Kingdom (Scotland)
Lidingö	30	11.5	Sweden
Gavdos	29.6	11	Greece
Straumøya	29.5	11	Norway
Kirkeøy (in Østfold)	29.5	11	Norway
Graciosa	29	11	Spain (Canary Islands)
Shapinsay	29	11	United Kingdom (Scotland)
Vårdö	29	11	Finland (Åland)
Čiovo	28.8	11	Croatia
Tromøya	28.5	11	Norway
Halki	28.1	11	Greece
Bressay	28	11	United Kingdom (Scotland)
Ellingsøya	28	11	Norway
Luonnonmaa	28	11	Finland
Sarvisalo	28	11	Finland
Ytterøya (in Trøndelag)	28	11	Norway
Svínoy	27.1	10.5	Denmark (Faroe Islands)
Eday	27	10	United Kingdom (Scotland)
Hayling Island	27	10	United Kingdom (England)
Salina	27	10	Italy
Fjellværsøya	26.5	10	Norway
Fosnøyna	26.5	10	Norway
Lundøya	26.5	10	Norway
Valentia Island	26.3	10	Republic of Ireland
Foulness Island	26	10	United Kingdom (England)
Livonsaari	26	10	Finland
Norderney	26	10	Germany
Olib	26	10	Croatia
Paxi	25.3	10	Greece
Finnøy (in Rogaland)	25	9.5	Norway
Kalamos	25	9.5	Greece
Scalpay	25	9.5	United Kingdom (Scotland)
Kyra Panagia	25	9.5	Greece
Sandön	24.9	9.5	Sweden
Singö	24.8	9	Sweden
Torö	24.6	9	Sweden
Tjøme	24.5	9	Norway
Portsea Island	24.3	9	United Kingdom (England)
Ängesön	24.2	9	Sweden
Aldra	24	9	Norway
Fågelbrolandet	24	9	Sweden
Holmöarna	24	9	Sweden
Österö-Västerö (in Vörå)	24	9	Finland
Rånö	23.9	9	Sweden
Giglio Island	23.8	9	Italy
Gorumna Island	23.8	9	Republic of Ireland
Selbjørn	23.8	9	Norway
Utö	23.6	9	Sweden
Khortytsia	23.9	9	Ukraine
Lismore	23.5	9	United Kingdom (Scotland)
Åmøya (in Nordland)	23.4	9	Norway
Anholt	23	9	Denmark
Île d'Yeu	23	9	France
Kumlinge (in Kumlinge, Åland)	23	9	Finland (Åland)
Östersocknen (in Föglö, Åland)	23	9	Finland (Åland)
Poros	22.9	9	Greece
Molat	22.8	8.5	Croatia
Södra Muskö	22.5	8.5	Sweden
Vir	22.4	8.5	Croatia
Tromsøya	22.4	8.5	Norway
Meganisi	22.4	8.5	Greece
Spetses	22.2	8.5	Greece
Hulløya	22.1	8.5	Norway
Fur	22	8.5	Denmark
Halsön (in Korsnäs)	22	8.5	Finland
Hirvensalo (in Turku/Åbo)	22	8.5	Finland
Isoluoto (in Särkisalo/Finby)	22	8.5	Finland
Lurøya	22	8.5	Norway
Munapirtti (in Pyhtää/Pyttis)	22	8.5	Finland
Nordfugløya	22	8.5	Norway
Blidö	21.9	8.5	Sweden
Meløya	21.8	8.5	Norway
Spildra	21.4	8.5	Norway
Paşalimanı	21.4	8.5	Turkey
Storön	21.3	8	Sweden
Great Bernera	21.2	8	United Kingdom (Scotland)
Saria	21.1	8	Greece
Bergö (in Malax/Maalahti)	21	8	Finland
Kakskerta (in Turku/Åbo)	21	8	Finland
Vahterpää (in Ruotsinpyhtää/Strömfors)	21	8	Finland
Vulcano	20.9	8	Italy
Avşa	20.6	8	Turkey
Amrum	20.5	8	Germany
Hidra	20.4	8	Norway
Antikythera	20.4	8	Greece
Lampedusa	20.2	8	Italy
Attu (Finland) (in Pargas/Parainen)	20	8	Finland
Eigerøya	20	8	Norway
Langeoog	20	8	Germany
Isola Ferdinandea	20	8	Italy
Ulva	20	8	United Kingdom (Scotland)
Vengsøya	20	8	Norway
Vigra	20	8	Norway
Whalsay	20	8	United Kingdom (Scotland)
Favignana	20	8	Italy
Elafonisos	20	8	Greece
Kråkerøy	20	9	Norway

== Artificial islands or not usually regarded as islands ==
What the ranking would be if added.	Island	Area (km^{2})	Area (sq mi)	Country
7	Jutland (North of the Kiel Canal)	28,500	11,000	Denmark
9	Peloponnese	21,549.6	8,320.3	Greece
40	Flevopolder	970	370	Netherlands
286	Antillia (Phantom Island)	60	23	Spain?
473	Doles sala	21	8	Latvia

== See also ==
- List of Caribbean islands by area
- List of European islands by population
- List of islands by area
- List of islands by population

== Notes ==
- Islands of Arctic Russia are considered part of Europe as long as they are situated west of the Yamal Peninsula. This means that the islands of Franz Josef Land, Novaya Zemlya plus for example Kolguyev and Vaygach Island are considered part of Europe. Islands of Svalbard are in the same category.
- The figures of Bolshoy Berezovy, Storøya and Wahlbergøya are rough estimates from map.

== Sources ==
- ISLANDS
- Suomen suurimmat saaret (also includes freshwater islands)
- Finland The Land of Islands and Waters
