= Vato =

Vato (Spanish pronunciation: [ˈbato]) (Spanish "guy") may refer to:

== Geography ==
- Vätö, island in the Norrtälje archipelago
  - Vätö Church medieval church in Vätö in Stockholm County, Sweden
- Port Vato village at the south coast of the island of Ambrym in Vanuatu

== Entertainment ==
- "Vato" (song), a song by Snoop Dogg
- "Vato", a song by DJ Mustard (featuring YG, Jeezy and Que)
- "Vatos", an episode of The Walking Dead
- El Vato, a television series based on the life of Mexican singer El Dasa

== Other ==
- Swamini Vato sayings of Gunatitanand Swami
- Vatos Locos, gangs

== See also ==
- Cholo (subculture)
