= Omenainen =

Uninhabited island in Finland

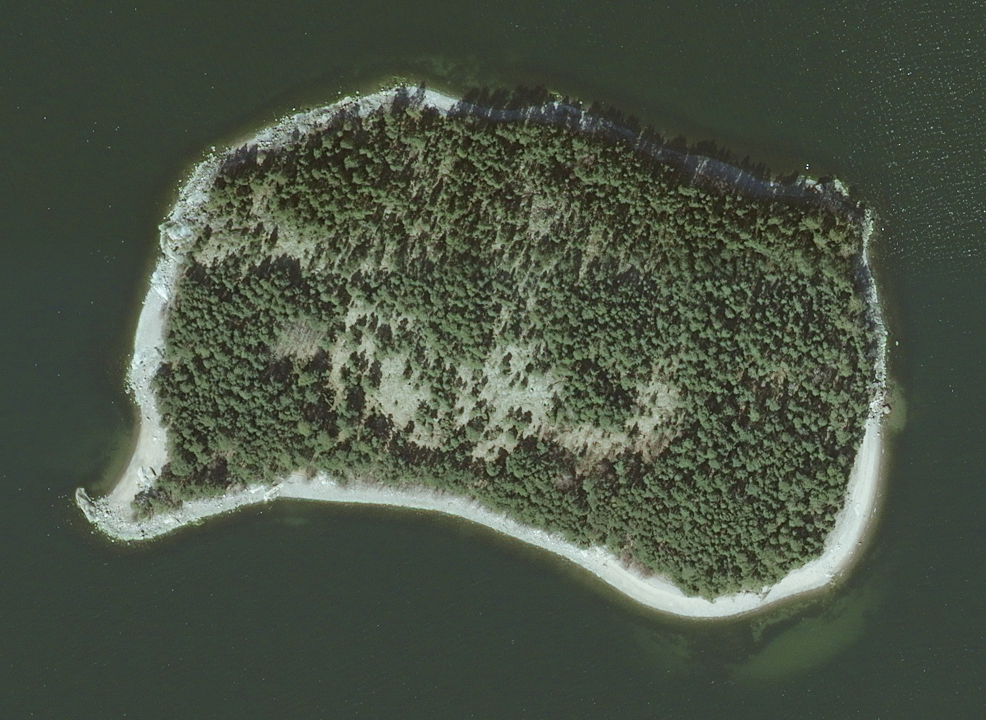
- An aerial photography of the Omenainen island

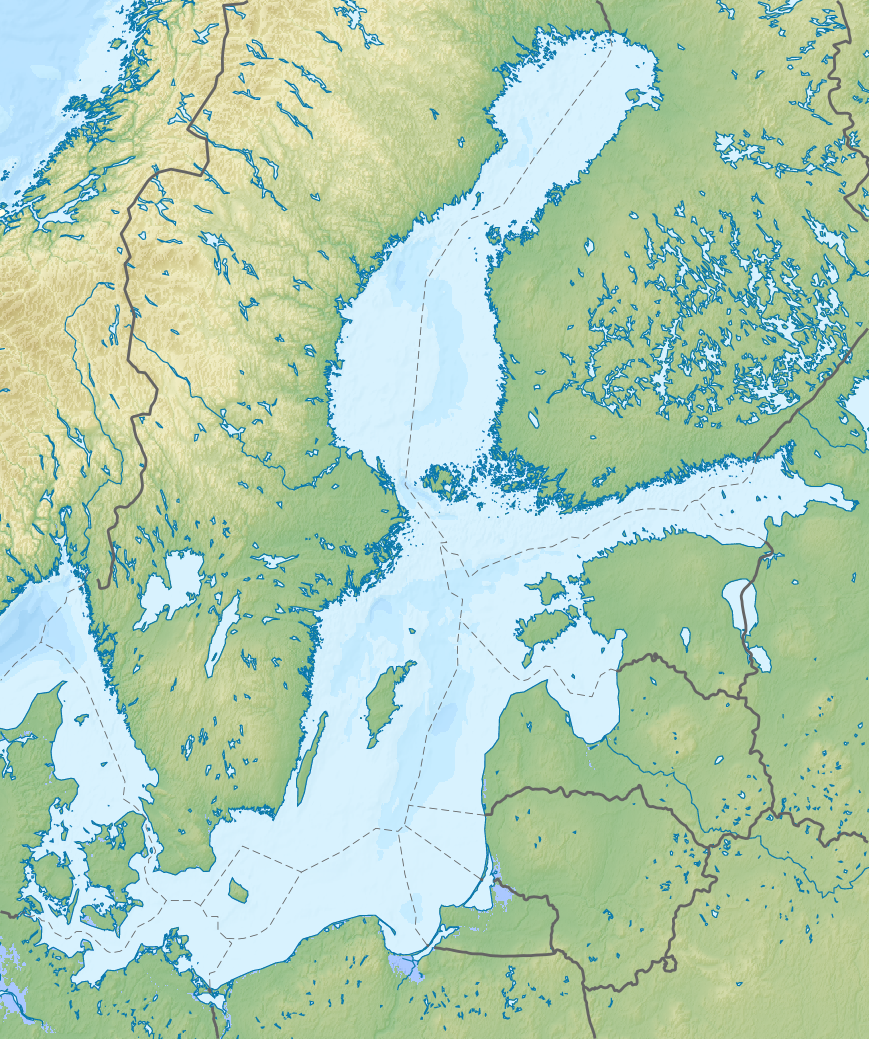
- Location within Finland Location within Baltic Sea
- Interactive map of Omenainen

Geography
- Coordinates: 60°15′8.05″N 21°52′30.68″E

Administration
- Finland

Omenainen (or Ominainen; Swedish: Ominaisholmen) is a state-owned uninhabited island in the municipality of Nagu (now Pargas), Finland, in the central Archipelago Sea. The size of the island is about seven hectares and its highest point is about 22 meters high. Trees grow there, and the beaches are rugged and inaccessible. The island belongs to the nationally valuable landscape area of Airisto–Seili, and the Natura 2000 area to the Själö archipelago.

The dead of the parishioners of Rymättylä and Nagu, who the church refused to bury in the blessed land, such as murderers, suicides and other sinners, were once taken to the island. The last deceased were buried in Omenainen in the mid-1850s. In the late 1960s, the Rymättylä parish declared the island a burial ground. In folklore, the island has a frightening reputation: it is considered cursed and ghost stories are told about it. Based on the stories, the author Maila Heikkilä published the youth book Yö kummitussaaressa ("Night on the Ghost Island") in 1986; in the book, the protagonist Janne finds a newspaper story about the ghost island called Omenainen and entices his sister Päivi to spend the night on the island with him.
