= Continental Europe =

Mainland Europe, excluding European islands

The extent of continental Europe

Continental Europe or mainland Europe is the contiguous mainland of Europe, excluding its surrounding islands. It can also be referred to ambiguously as the European continent, – which can conversely mean the whole of Europe – and, by some, simply as the Continent. When Eurasia is regarded as a single continent, Europe is treated both as a continent and subcontinent.

== Conceptual history ==
The continental territory of the historical Carolingian Empire was one of the many old cultural concepts used for mainland Europe. This was consciously invoked in the 1950s as one of the bases for the prospective European integration (see also multi-speed Europe)

The most common definition of mainland Europe excludes these continental islands: the Greek islands, Cyprus, Malta, Sicily, Sardinia, Corsica, the Balearic Islands, Great Britain and Ireland and surrounding islands, Novaya Zemlya and the Nordic archipelago, as well as nearby oceanic islands, including the Canary Islands, Madeira, the Azores, Iceland, the Faroe Islands, and Svalbard.

The Scandinavian Peninsula is sometimes also excluded even though it is a part of "mainland Europe", as the de facto connections to the rest of the continent were historically across the Baltic Sea or North Sea (rather than via the lengthy land route that involves travelling to the north of the peninsula where it meets Finland, and then south through northeast Europe).

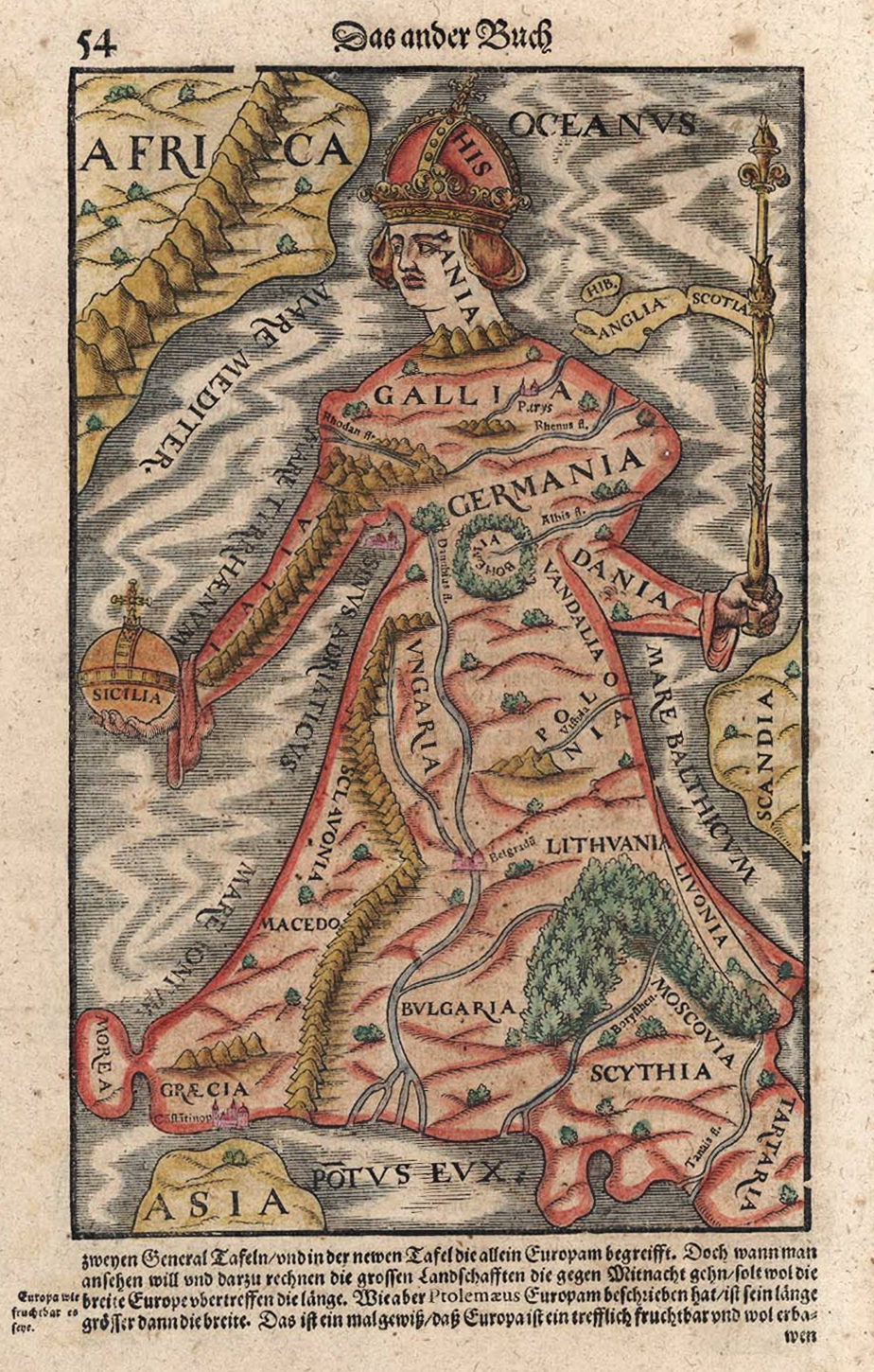
Europa Regina map (Sebastian Munster, 1570), excluding the greater part of Fennoscandia, but including Great Britain and Ireland, Bulgaria, Scythia, Moscovia and Tartaria; Sicily is clasped by Europe in the form of a globus cruciger.

== Great Britain and Ireland ==
Great Britain, off the western coast of the continental landmass, is the largest island of Europe by both area and population. It is geographically close, with the Strait of Dover being 34 kilometres (21 mi) at its narrowest. In both Great Britain and Ireland (which together consist of the states of the United Kingdom and the Republic of Ireland), the Continent is generally used to refer to the mainland of Europe. An amusing British newspaper headline supposedly once read, "Fog in Channel; Continent Cut Off". It has also been claimed that this was a regular weather forecast in Britain in the 1930s. In addition, the sole word Europe itself is also regularly used to mean anywhere on continental Europe.

Derivatively, the adjective continental refers to the social practices or fashion of continental Europe, or at least specific parts of it. Examples include breakfast, topless sunbathing and, historically, long-range driving (before Britain had motorways) often known as Grand Touring. Remaining differences as seen in electrical plugs, the use of left-hand traffic, and for the United Kingdom, the continued use of certain imperial units alongside the metric units (which have long since displaced customary units in continental Europe) have reinforced the idea.

In 1994, Britain became physically connected to continental Europe for the first time (since becoming an island 8000 years ago) through the opening of the undersea Channel Tunnel. The tunnel accommodates passenger traffic between the island and northern France while maintaining border controls on each side.

== Scandinavia ==
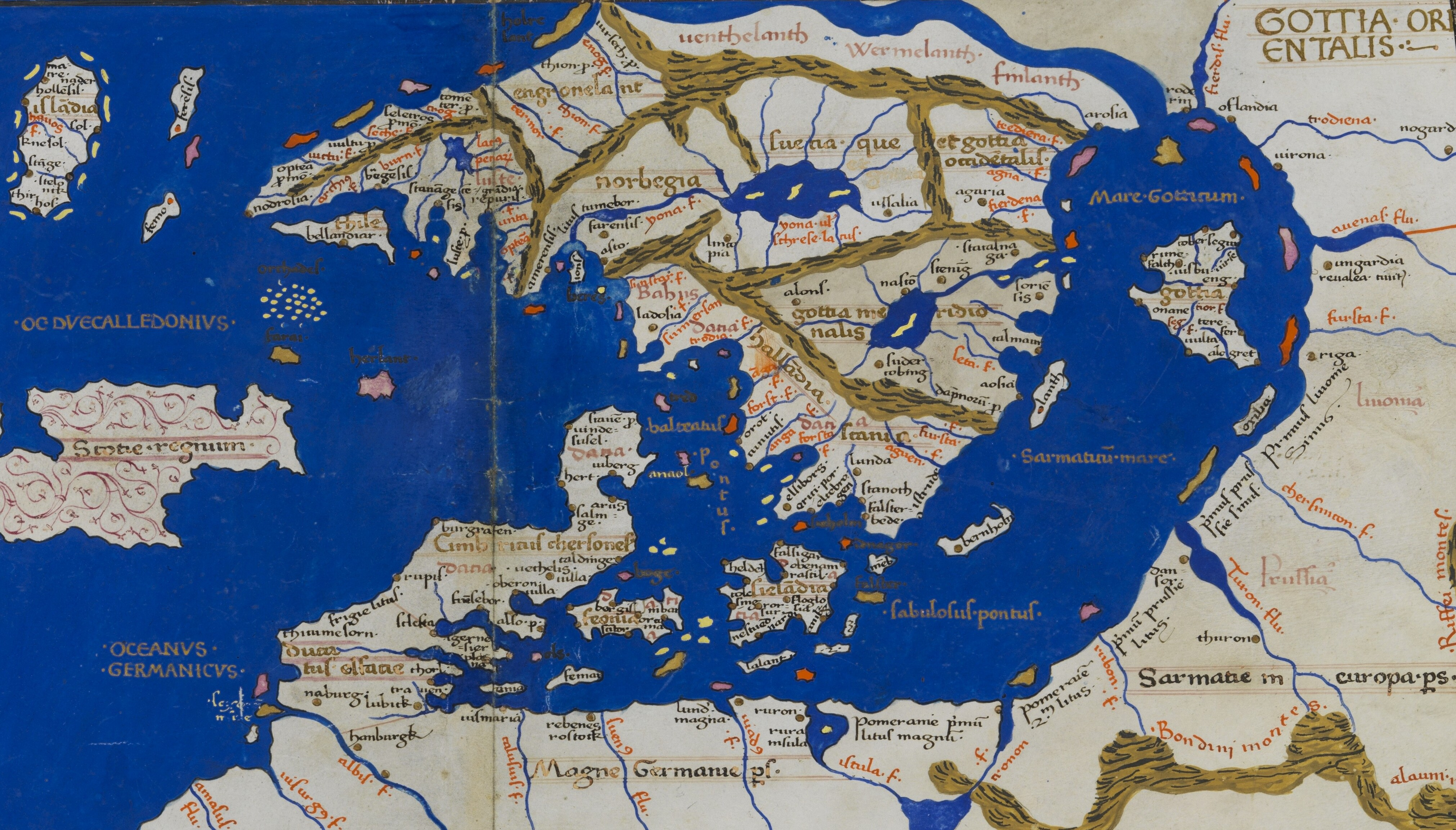
The Scandiae islands by Nicolaus Germanus for a 1467 publication of Cosmographia Claudii Ptolomaei Alexandrini

The Scandinavian Peninsula is attached to continental Europe, however the land route runs along the 66th parallel north, in the north of the peninsula. The de facto connections to the rest of the continent were historically across the Baltic Sea or North Sea, thus making Scandinavia functionally an "island" and is why the region is often excluded from continental Europe, including by the European Union which make a distinction between Scandinavia and Mainland Europe. In traditional Germanic studies, continental refers to the European continent excluding the Scandinavian Peninsula (as well as Britain, Ireland, and Iceland). In Denmark (not on the peninsula), Jutland is referred to as the national mainland and thereby a part of continental Europe.

People in Scandinavia have viewed the region as distinct and a separate entity to continental Europe, similar as in Britain. The term Kontinenten in Swedish or Kontinentet in Norwegian ("the Continent") is a vernacular expression that refers to continental Europe but with the exclusion of Sweden, Norway, and Finland (although Denmark is included, despite the Danish Archipelago technically not a part of continental Europe). Another Swedish expression is nere på kontinenten, meaning "down on the continent". Some other differences in social culture and climate have further reinforced this idea of it being separate.

The opening of the Great Belt Bridge and Øresund Bridge, in 1998 and 2000, have for the first time provided a direct physical connection from the Scandinavian Peninsula to the Danish mainland (the Jutland Peninsula), and thus the European mainland. This also included the other Danish islands (Zealand and Funen), as was noted in the New York Times headline: "Copenhagen is linked to the Continent".

== Mediterranean and Atlantic islands ==
The term The Continent may also be used from the perspective of the island residents of each country to describe the continental portion of their country or the continent (or mainland) as a whole. So for example, "continent" may be used to refer to the continental part of France (excluding Corsica and overseas France), the continental part of Greece (excluding the Aegean Islands, Crete, and the Ionian Islands), the continental part of Italy (excluding Sardinia, Sicily, etc.), the continental part of Portugal (excluding the Azores and Madeira), or the continental part of Spain (excluding the Balearic Islands, the Canary Islands, the plazas de soberanía, etc.).

The part of continental France located in Europe is also known as l'Hexagone, "the Hexagon", referring to its approximate shape on a map. Continental Italy is also known as lo Stivale, "the Boot", referring to its approximate shape on a map. Continental Spain is referred to as peninsular Spain.

== See also ==
- Contiguous United States
- Geographical midpoint of Europe
- Hajnal line
- Regions of Europe
