= HSwMS Försiktigheten =

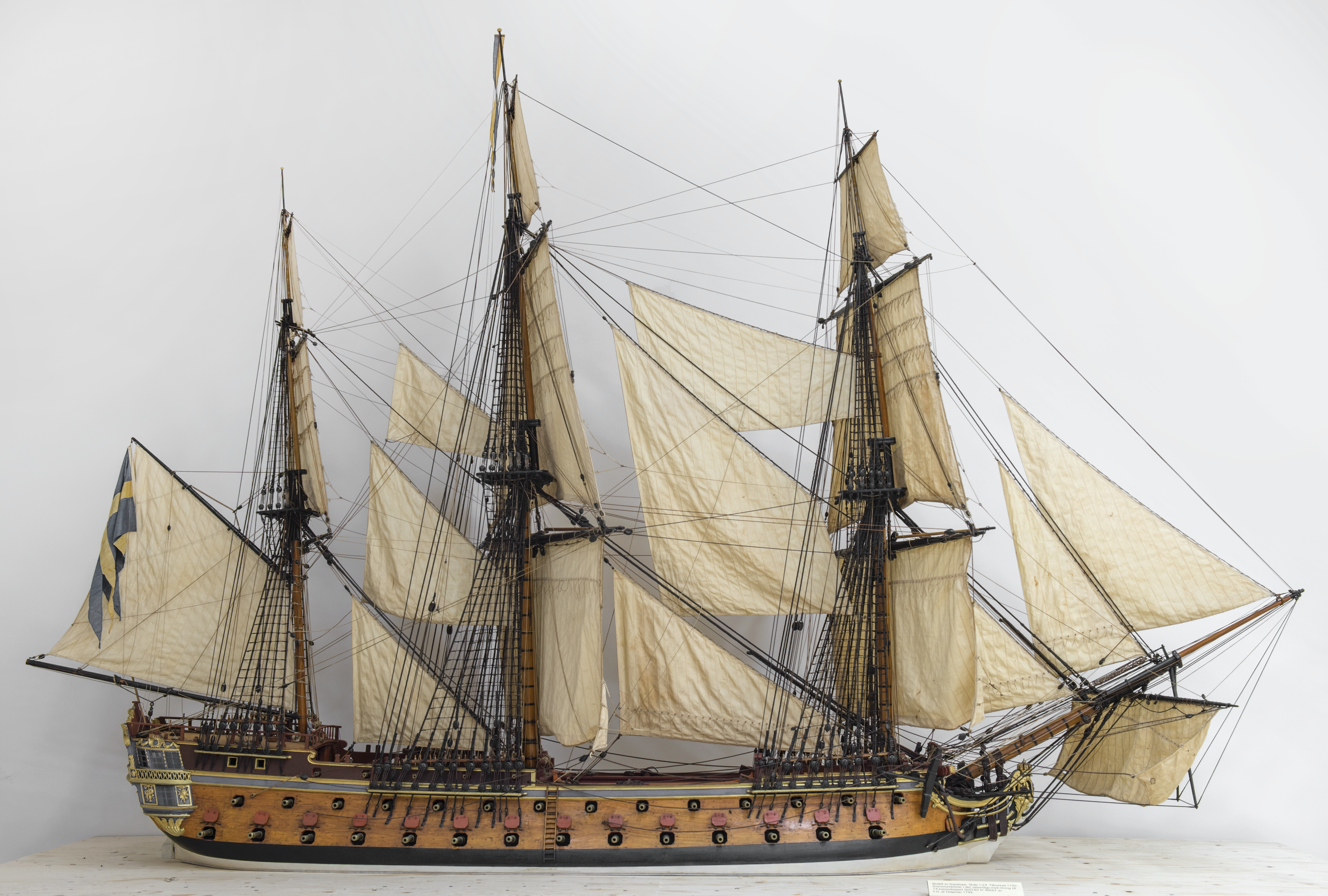
- Model of Försiktigheten from 1790, at the Swedish National Maritime Museum in Stockholm.

History

Sweden
- Name: Försiktigheten
- Builder: Karlskrona Naval Shipyard
- Laid down: 28 August 1784
- Launched: 23 October 1784
- Commissioned: 1784
- Decommissioned: 1825
- Fate: Decommissioned in 1825
- Notes: Designed by Fredrik Henrik af Chapman

General characteristics
- Type: Ship of the line
- Displacement: 1,925 tons
- Length: 49.58 m (162 ft 8 in)
- Beam: 13.66 m (44 ft 10 in)
- Draft: 5.94 m (19 ft 6 in)
- Armament: (62 guns total); 26 × 24-pounder guns; 28 × 18-pounder guns; 8 × 6-pounder guns

HSwMS Försiktigheten (English: Prudence) was a Swedish ship of the line launched on 23 October 1784 at the Karlskrona Naval Shipyard. Designed by Fredrik Henrik af Chapman, she was one of ten ships built to a standard plan, with HSwMS Kronprins Gustaf Adolf as the first of the series.

The ship was named after a classical Greek figure symbolizing prudence. Her figurehead and other decorative carvings were created by the sculptor Johan Törnström.

== Service history ==
Försiktigheten took part in the Russo-Swedish War (1788–1790), particularly at:

- the Battle of Hogland (17 July 1788)
- the Battle of Öland (1789) (17 July 1789)
- the Battle of Reval (13 May 1790)
- the Vyborg Bay escape (3 July 1790)

She also served in the Finnish War (1808–1809), including the Ratan expedition in 1809. The ship was removed from service in 1825. Hans Fahlstedt commanded the ship from 1788 to 1790 and Nils Adolph af Ekenstam in 1794. Johan Petter Warberg was the ship's commanding officer in 1809.

== Gallery ==
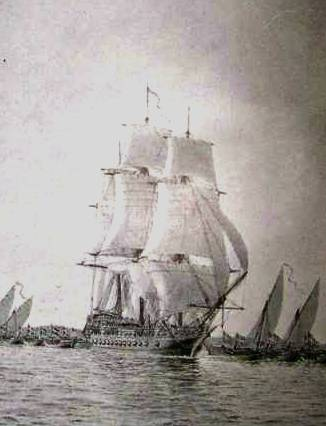
Försiktigheten passing Hemsön in Härnösand Municipality
