= Johanna Holmström =

Finnish-Swedish writer

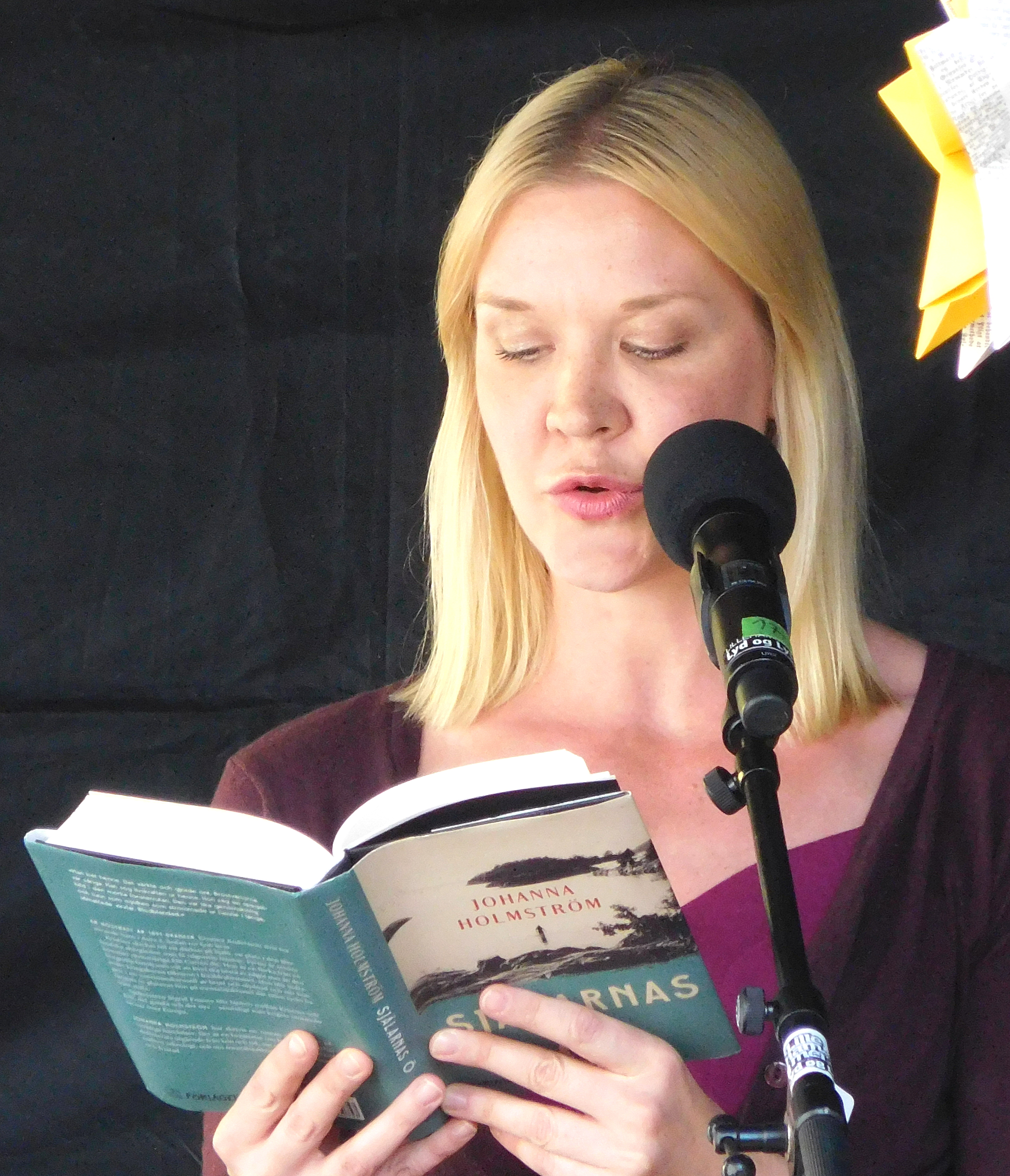
Johanna Holmström (2018)

Johanna Holmström (born 1981) is a Finland-Swedish author.

Holmström was born in Sipoo and lives in Helsinki. Her first publication was the short-story collection Inlåst och andra noveller (2003), from which the short story "Inlåst" ('Locked Up') was nominated for the Swedish Radio Short-story Prize in 2004. This was followed by the short story collection Tvåsamhet (‘Twosomeness’, 2005). Holmström's first novel was published in September 2007: Ur din längtan ('Out of your Longing'). In 2009 she won the Svenska Dagbladet Literature Prize for her third short-story collection Camera Obscura, a connected series of stories focused on young eco-terrorists in Helsinki. Since then, she has published Asfaltsänglar ('Asphalt Angels', 2013), Hush Baby (2015) and Själarnas ö (Island of Souls, 2017). Själarnas ö tells the stories of three of the inmates of a women-only mental hospital on the island of Själö near Turku.

== Bibliography ==
- Inlåst och andra noveller (2003)
- Tvåsamhet (2005)
- Ur din längtan (2007)
- Camera obscura (2009)
- Asfaltsänglar (2013)
- Hush Baby (2015)
- Själarnas ö (2017)

== Sources ==
- http://www.finlit.fi/fili/en/books/asphalt-angels/
