= Nagu =

Nagu Nagu – Nauvo
- Former municipality
- Nagu kommun Nauvon kunta
- Coat of arms

- Location of Nagu in Finland.
- Interactive map of Nagu
- Location within Southwest Finland Location within Finland Location within Europe
- Coordinates: 60°11′35″N 021°54′25″E
- Country: Finland
- Region: Southwest Finland
- Consolidated: 2009

Area
  - Total: 1,698.44 km^{2} (655.77 sq mi)
  - Land: 246.88 km^{2} (95.32 sq mi)
  - Water: 1,451.56 km^{2} (560.45 sq mi)

Population (2008-12-31)
  - Total: 1,428
  - Density: 5.784/km^{2} (14.98/sq mi)
- Time zone: UTC+2 (EET)
  - Summer (DST): UTC+3 (EEST)

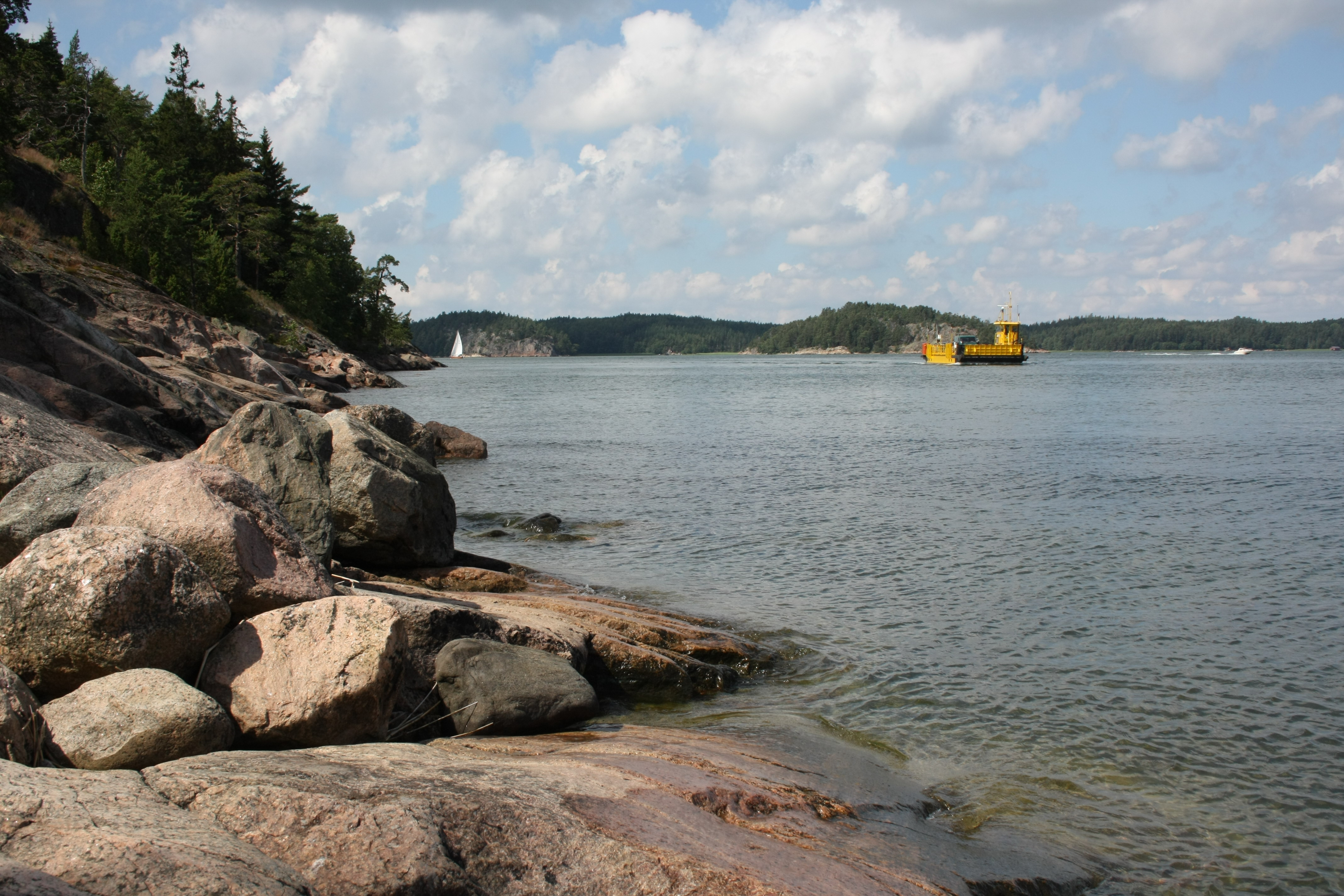
Nagu, Finland

Nagu (Finland Swedish: [ˈnɑːɡʉ]; Finnish: Nauvo [ˈnɑu̯ʋo]) is a former municipality and parish of Finland. On 1 January 2009, it was consolidated with Houtskär, Iniö, Korpo and Pargas to form the new town of Väståboland. On 1 January 2012 the name Väståboland was changed to Pargas.

Nagu consists of two main islands (Lillandet and Storlandet) and 1500–3000 smaller islands and skerries located south of Turku in the province of Western Finland in the region of Southwest Finland. The Nagu archipelago is part of the world's largest brackish water archipelago with 100 000 islands, islets and skerries in Sweden, Finland and Estonia. The total area of Nagu is 1 698,44 km2, of which the land area is only 246.88 km^{2} (95.32 sq mi), or less than 15%.

Nagu has a population of approximately 1 400 persons, but during the summer over 10 000 more reside in the area.

Most of the islands belonging to the Nagu archipelago can be reached by a network of roads, bridges and cost-free connection boats covering the vast archipelago area and reaching also the most remote islands in the south, where Nagu shares borders with the international waters of the Baltic sea.

== Population ==
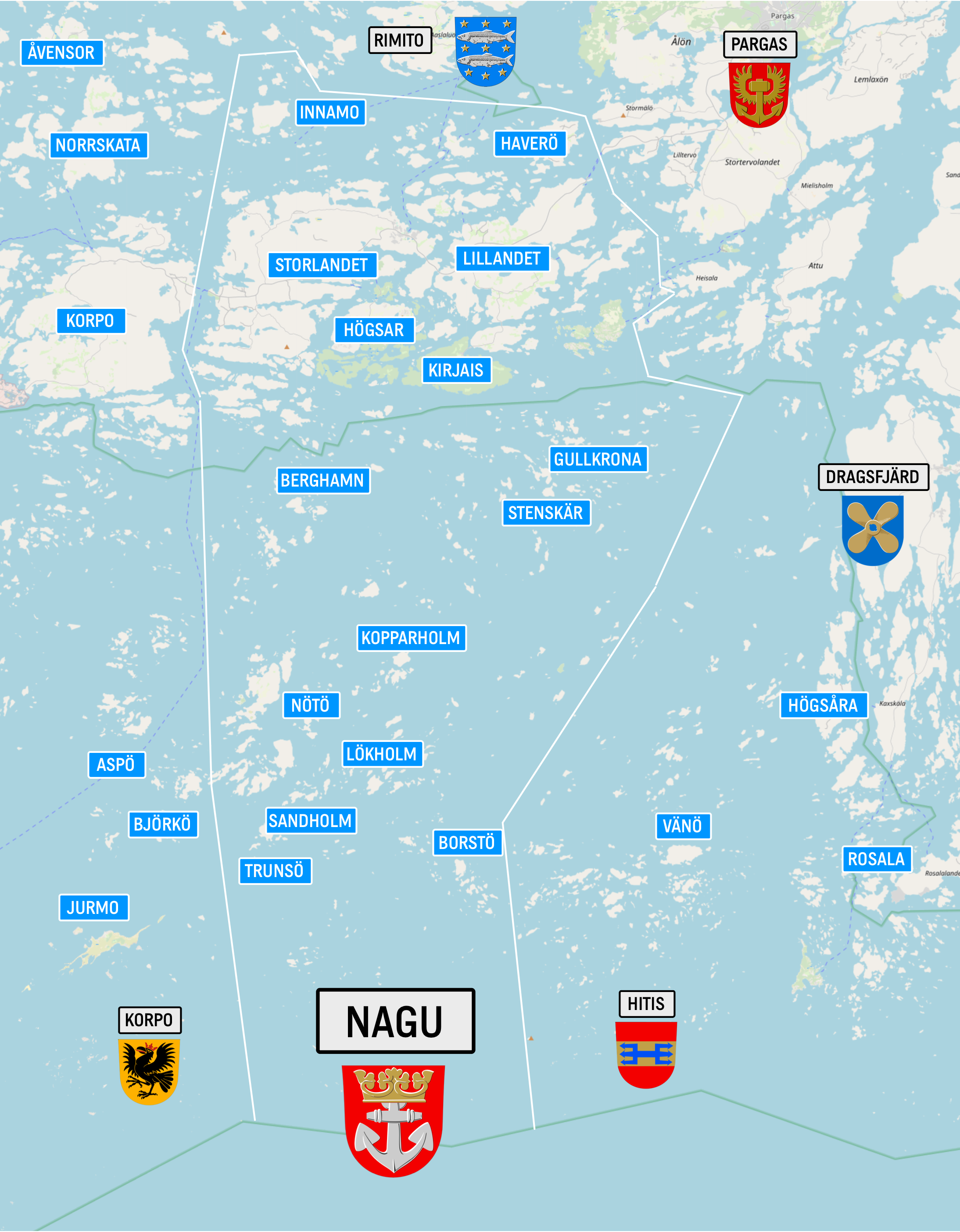
Nagu map including neighbours Korpo Rimito Pargas Dragsfjärd Hitis

Nagu has a population of approximately 1 400 inhabitants (1 428 as of 31 December 2008). Nagu is bilingual, with the majority (71%) being Swedish and the minority Finnish speakers.

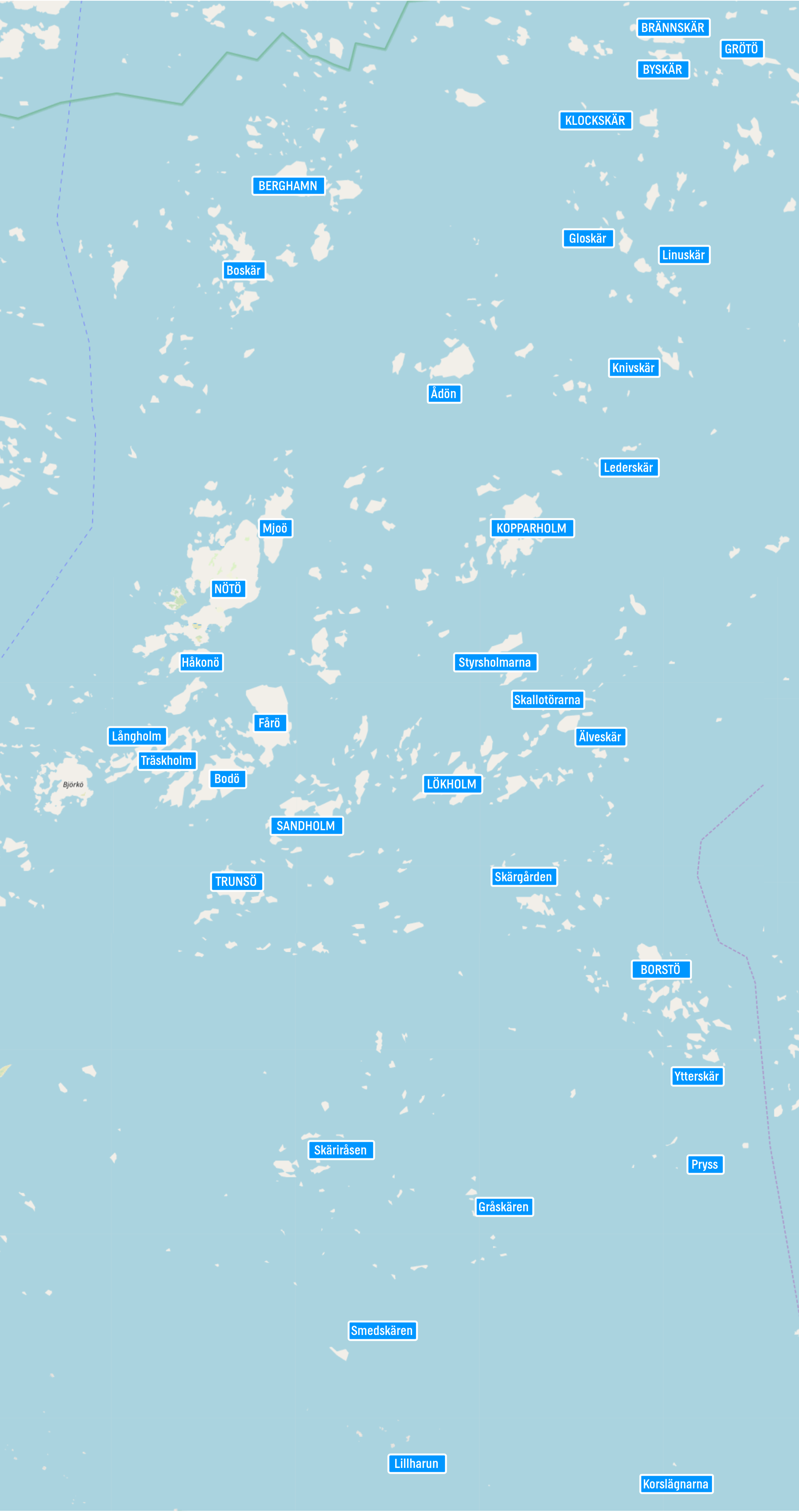
Nagu outer archipelago

The number of other minority languages is large with approximately 20 nationalities residing in Nagu. In 2015 a temporary refugee centre for asylum seeking families from Iraq, Afghanistan, Syria and Somalia was opened in Nagu by the Red Cross. The story of the successful integration of refugees in Nagu, also known as the ”Nagu model”, made it into international news when photographer Giles Duley visited Nagu during the winter of 2015–2016 as part of a series of photo articles for the UNHCR. Mr. Duley's visit was covered by the Guardian among other media. Out of the circa 120 persons staying that first winter in the premises of Hotel Strandbo, a couple of families have chosen to stay in Nagu after receiving residential permits. Through the addition of two Syrian refugee families receiving homes in Nagu in 2018 the Arabic language probably now holds third place among mother tongues spoken in Nagu.

=== Dialect ===
The Nagu dialect is a typical Åboländska dialect of Finland Swedish.

A sample of the dialect recorded in 1958 by Kurt Zilliacus (see file for transcription)

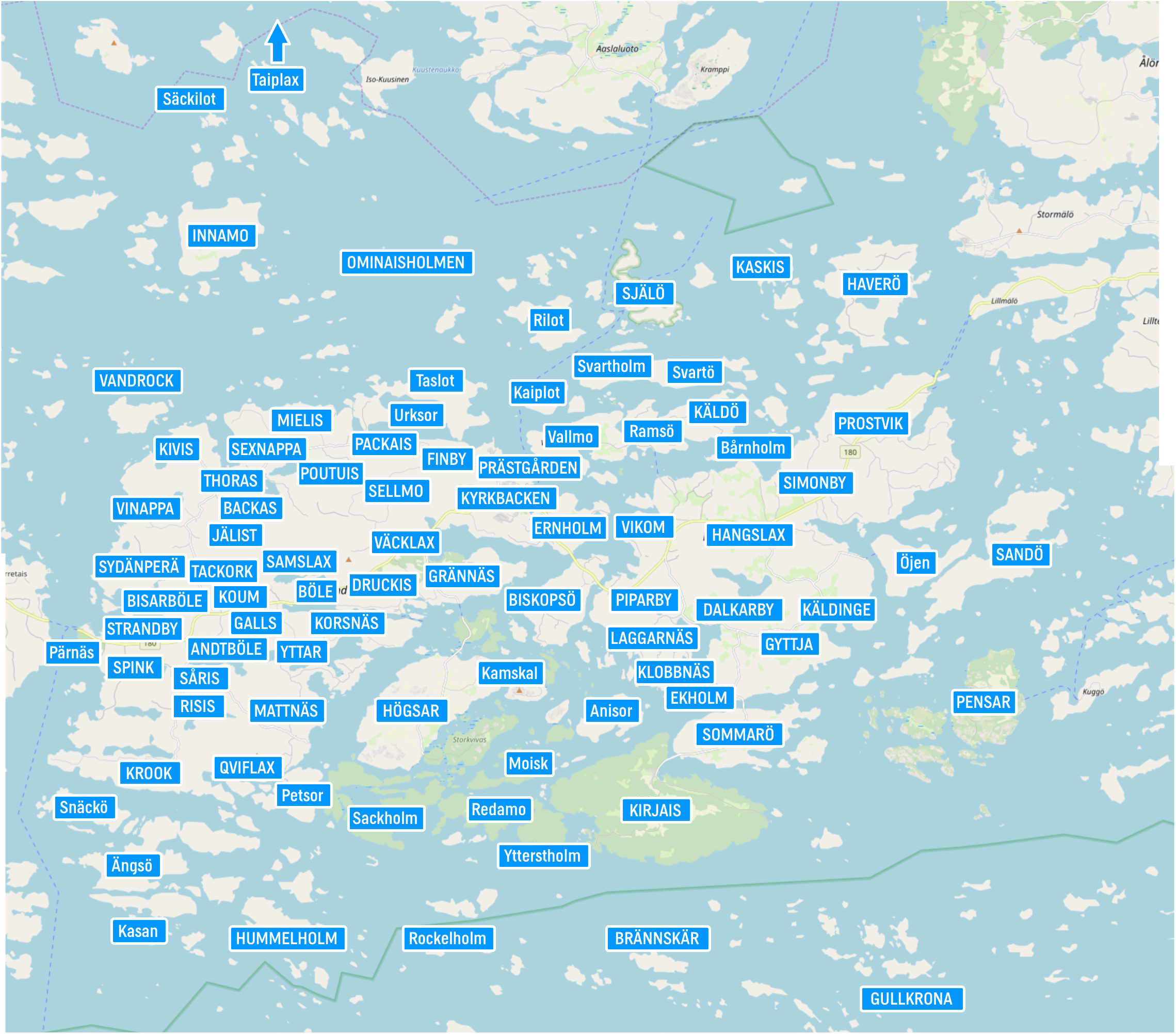
Central islands of Nagu

== Services ==
Nagu is among the biggest service and tourism centres of the archipelago region. All across the Nagu archipelago there are several leisure boat harbours, the biggest of which is situated in the centre of Nagu, a village called Kyrkbacken (Swedish for 'Church hill'). Besides the harbour and the 15th century church of Nagu the village offers two grocery stores, two banks, gas stations for both cars and boats, a post office, several daily coach connections in both directions (to Turku and Houtskär), several hotels and a large number of restaurants and souvenir shops. The souvenir shops and some of the restaurants are open during summer only.

== Sights ==
=== Churches and chapels in Nagu ===
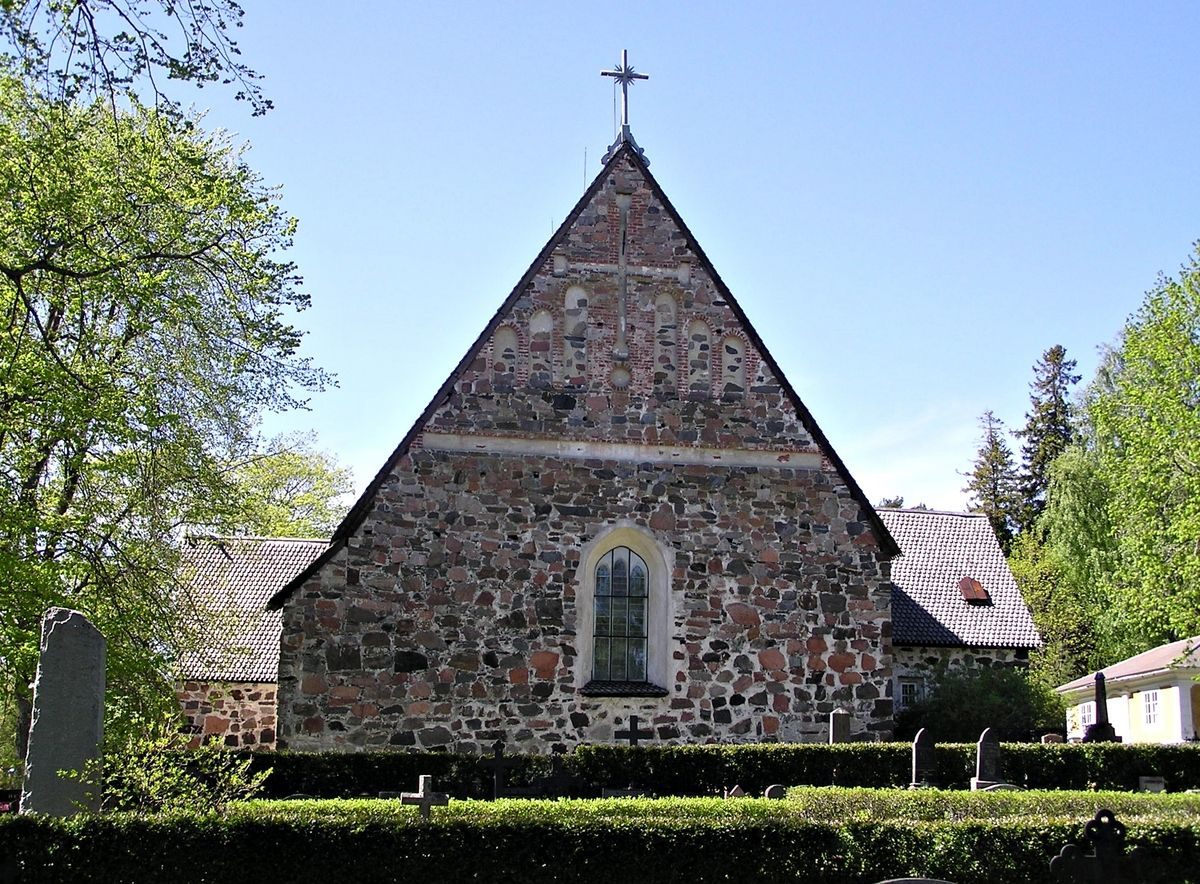
Nauvo church

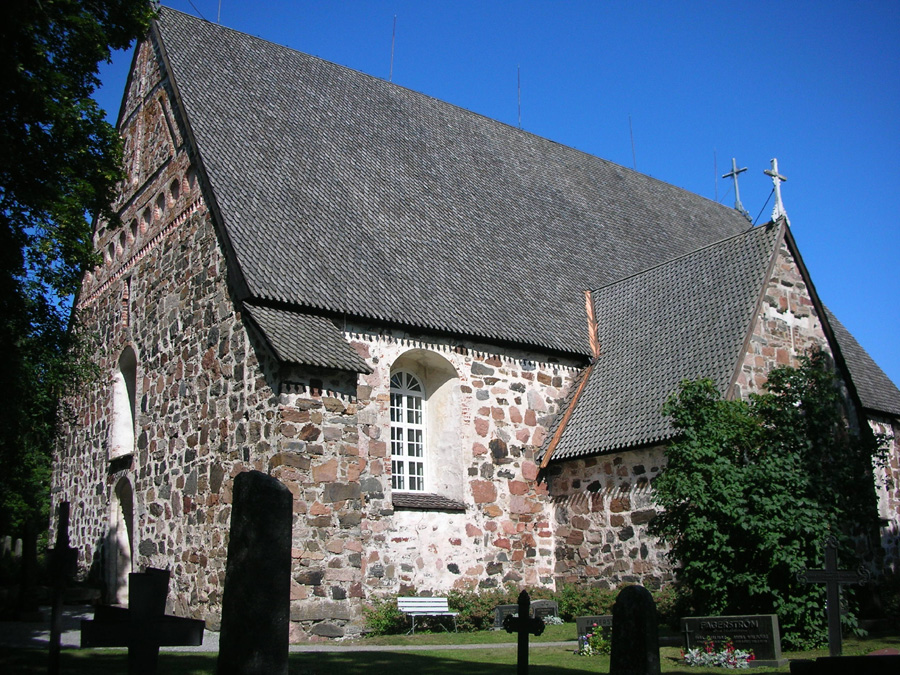
Nauvo church

The Nagu church, a medieval stone church from the middle of the 15th century, stands in the middle of the village Kyrkbacken (Eng: Church hill), the centre of Nagu. The Schwan organ from 1791 is the oldest organ in Finland still in use, that still mostly consists of original parts and sounds like it did in the 18th century.

The Nötö church, the Abraham chapel, was inaugurated on 2 July 1757. Before this there has been two previous chapels on the island. The Nötö church was decorated by Gustaf Lucander, whose altar piece still fills the wall around the altar window. Lucander also painted the apostles along the gallery. His self portrait can also be found in the church.

The Själö church was built in 1733. One part of the church hall is still enclosed by a barrier. This used to be where the lepers of Själö sat during service.

=== Kyrkbacken - the centre of Nagu ===
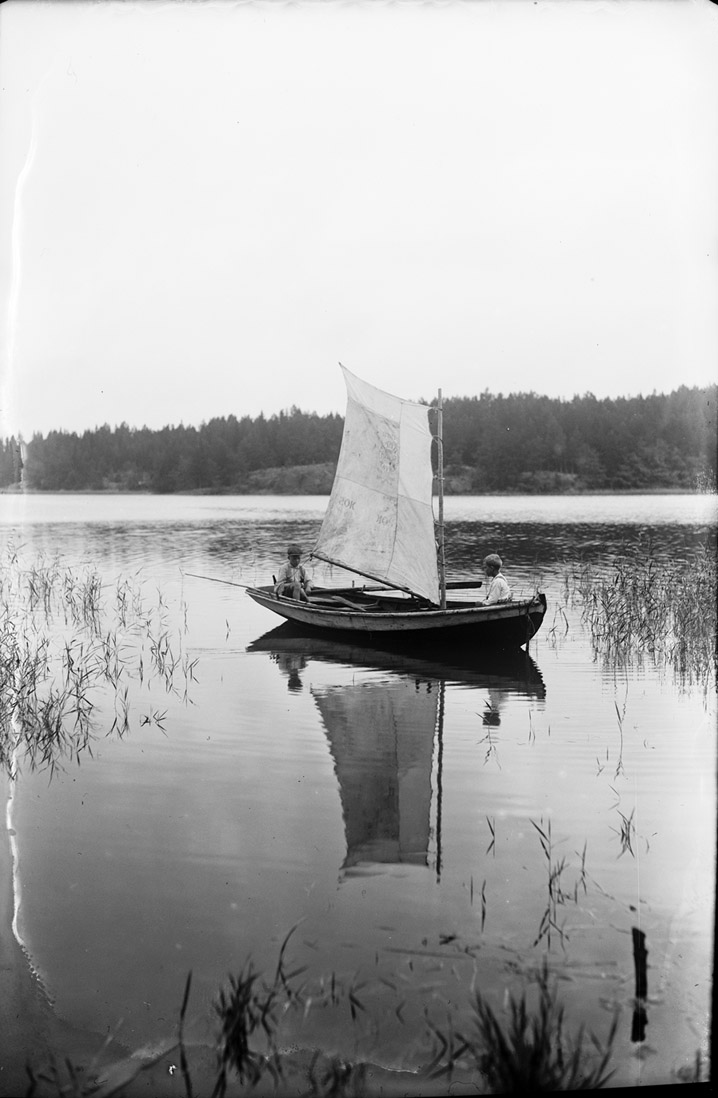
Sailboat on the water at Nagu. The Maritime House presents the naval history of the islands.

The Maritime House offers exhibitions about the naval history of Nagu from the early 19th century til' today. .

The Nagu-nalle Teddy's walk in the woods closest to the centre of Nagu is a popular walk among families with small children. The trail features the characters from the books about the Nagu-nalle Teddy, by Henrika Andersson.

The Westerholm trail is a 3 km long walk that starts from the market place in the South harbour in the centre and goes through the woods of nearby Ernholm. The Westerholm trail is not a traditional nature trail, but more of a cultural trail, telling its hikers about Victor Westerholm, a Finnish landscape artist, who spent part of his childhood on the island of Ernholm.

The Nagu harbour marina has been popular among sailors since the 1980. It was named "Harbour of the year" in 1984, but has since been improved and enlarged continuously. Besides jetties, harbour office, saunas, laundry facilities and a gas station for boats the harbour also offers restaurants and small shops.

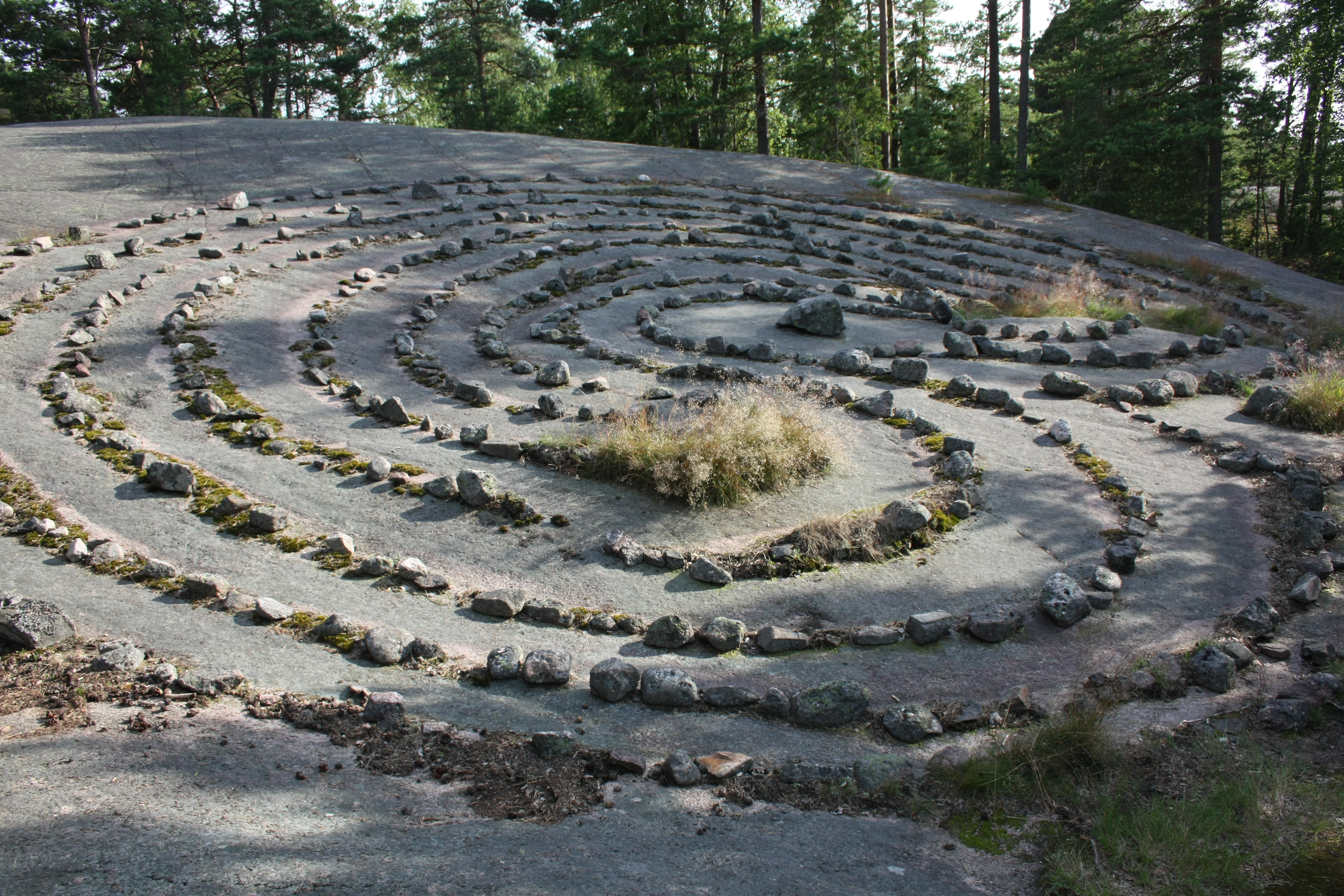
The Finby labyrinth

The labyrinth in Finby is a Troy Town labyrinth located on a walking distance from the centre (approx. 2 km). Follow the road Parkvägen west from the marina, past the sports and football fields and continue west on Norrstandsvägen. There are signs by the road marking the beginning of the track leading into the forest and up the labyrinth hill.

The island of Själö is not a part of the centre, but it can be visited on foot from the centre by those who take the connection boat M/S Östern (only during high-season, subject to a charge) or the M/S Falkö (outside the summer season, free of charge) from the harbour.

=== The rest of Nagu ===
The Estonia memorial in Pärnäs was erected in memory of the 852 deceased in the M/S Estonia disaster on the 28 of September 1994. A track leads to the memorial from the ferry harbour in Pärnäs.

The Fagerlund traktor museum is a privately owned museum in Tackork, about 10 km from the centre towards Korpo. The museum shows around 30 veteran tractors that have been completely restored.

The Kasberget hill in Prostvik is the highest hill (62 m. above sea level) in Nagus. A 4,4 km long trail leads to the hill from the Parola area, situated right by the main road. The hill offers a nice view over the northern parts of Nagu.

The Smörasken hill (Eng: the butter box hill) is a hill on the island of Högsar with a large glacial erratic resting on the top. Smörasken offers a nice view to the south.

The Vargberget hill in Mattnäs has a turret with a view over the southern parts of the island Storlandet. It is situated at the end of a 2,4 km long trail starting from Petsorvägen.

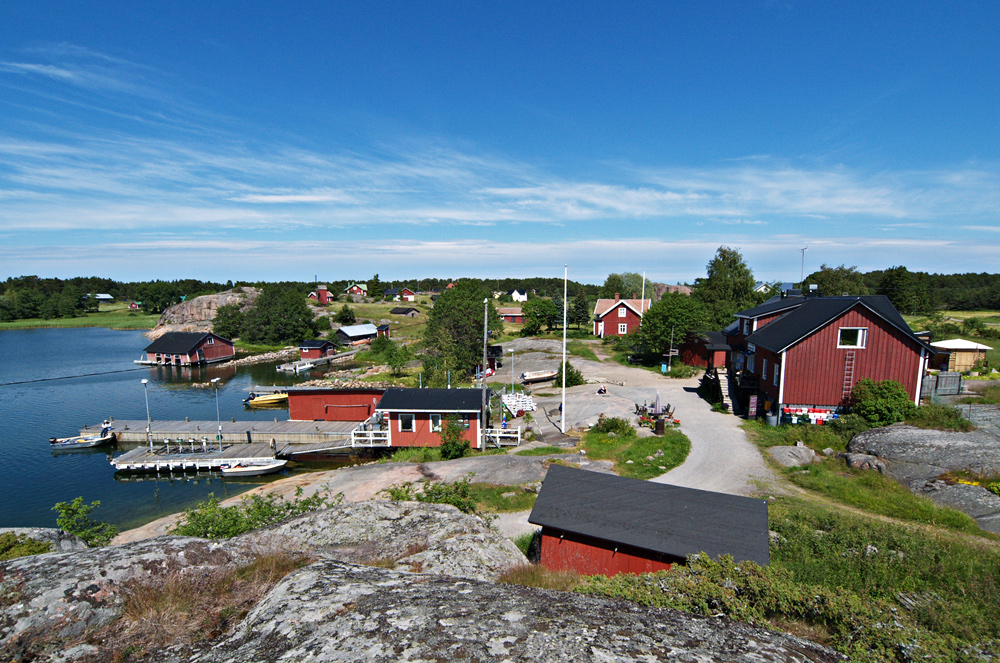
Island of Nötö

Nötö is an island community in the south of Nagu. During the summer Nötö offers a small marina, a store, a bed & breakfast and a café. Among places to visit there are the Nötö church (mentioned above) and nature trails leading the visitors to the "singing rock" and prehistoric grave sites.

Brännskär is a small island south of Kirjais with a marina, a café and rental cottages.

The White Guard memorial on Pensar

The hillfort island of Bornholm in Hangslax

== Connections ==
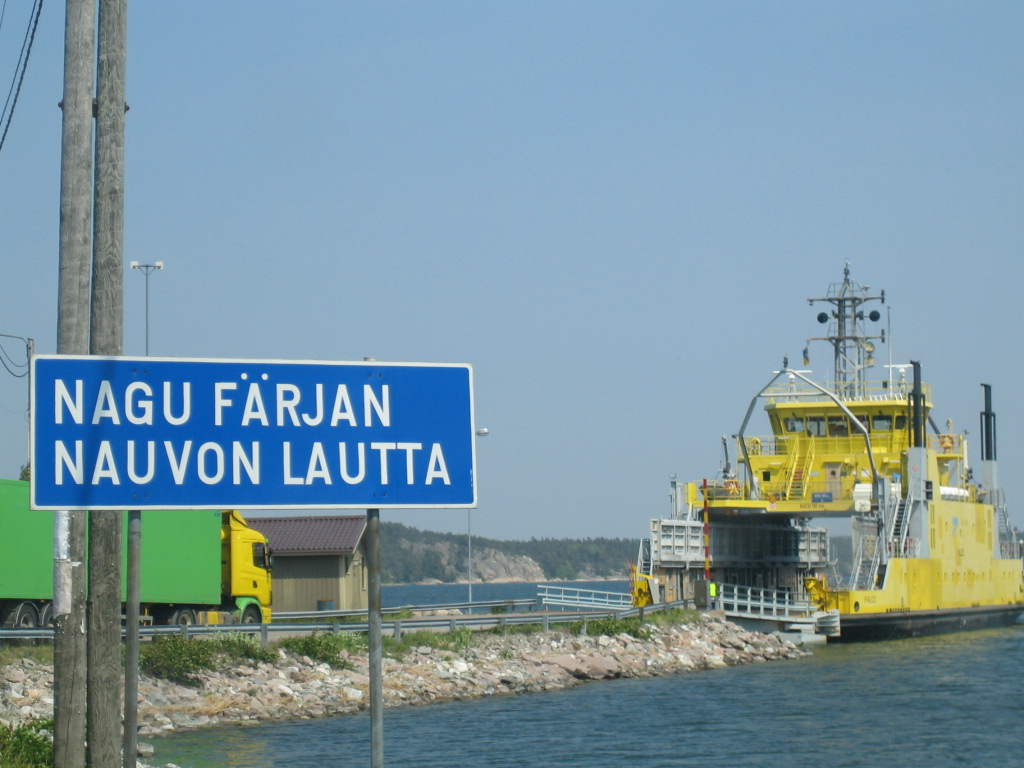
Two ferries transport cars between Nagu and Pargas

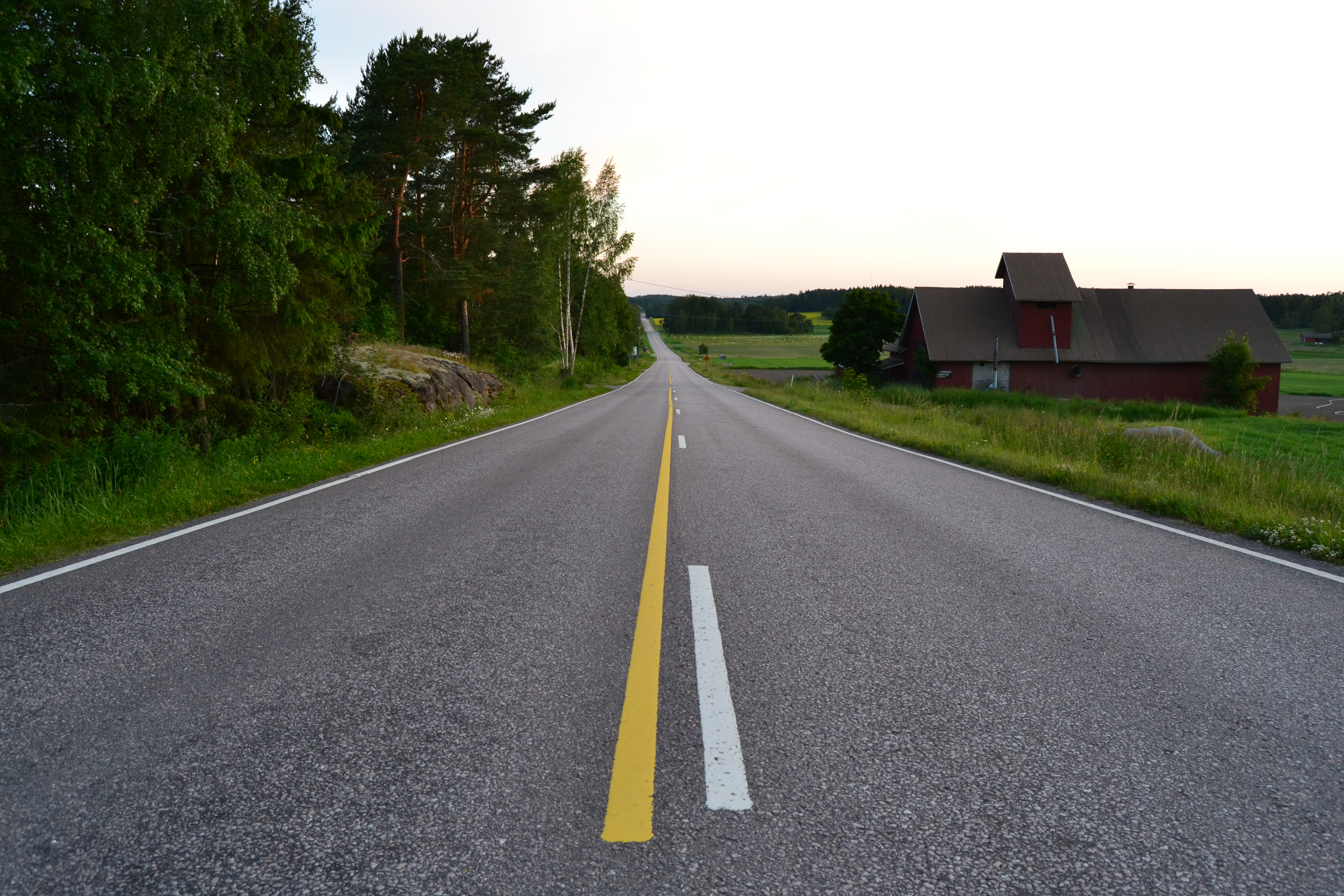
Regional Road 180, also known as the Archipelago Road, in Nagu

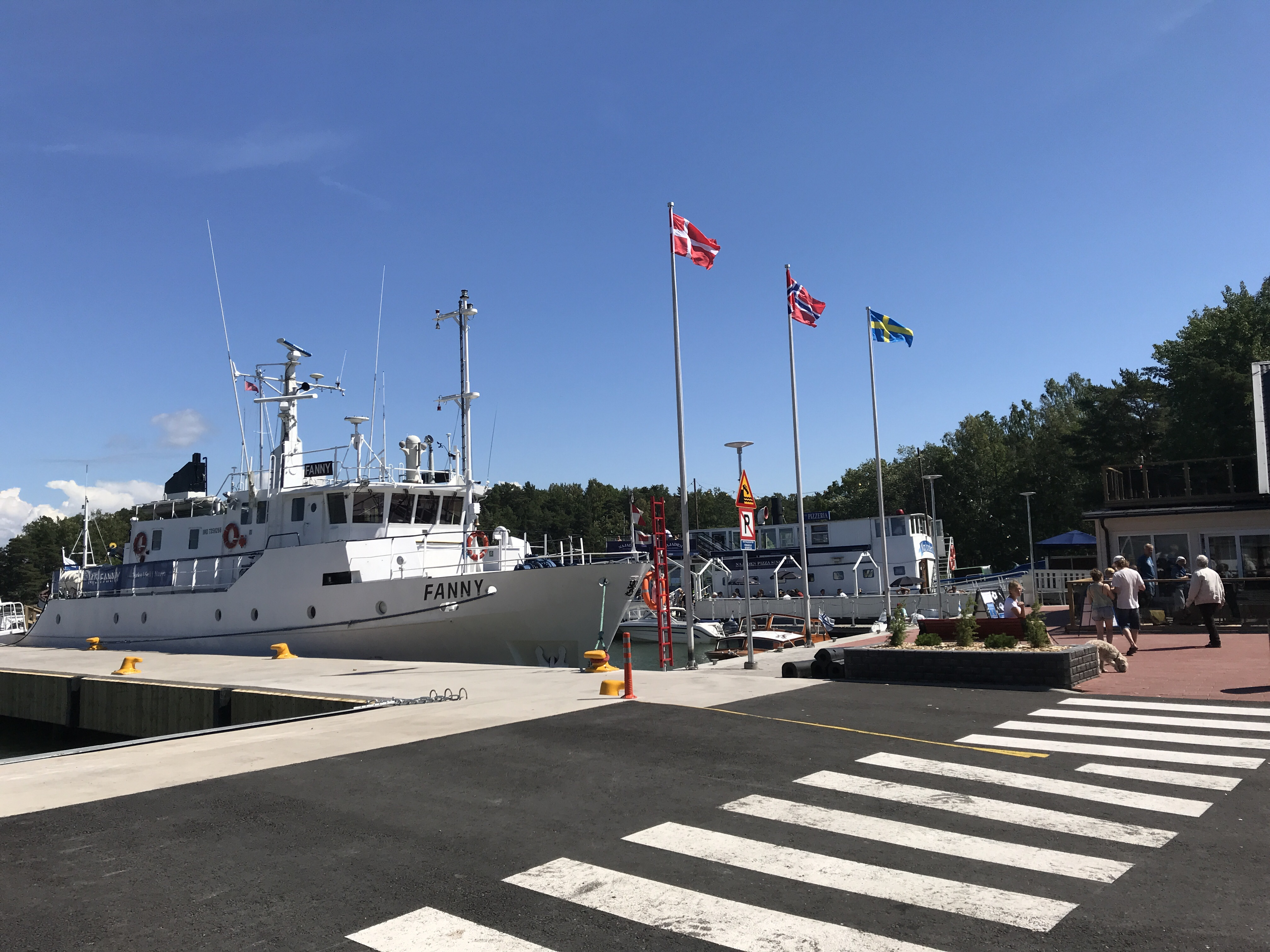
Nagu harbour

The main islands and the islands closest to them can be reached by car thanks to roads, bridges and smaller ferries. Cost-free connection boats go to the small islands further off the main islands. The main ports of the connection boats are the centre of Nagu, the harbour at the eastern sided of the island of Kirjais and the harbour at Pärnäs in the western part of the main island of Storlandet.

The centre of Nagu, Kyrkbacken, is a hub when it comes to transport and travelling in the archipelago. The Archipelago Road, the main road connecting the Turku area with Pargas and the rest of the islands in this part of the archipelago crosses the main islands and the centre of Nagu on its way to Korpo and Houtskär and from Korpo onwards to the Åland islands. Apart from stretching over a large number of bridges the Archipelago Road includes several ferry passages. To get to Nagu from Turku you need to cross one ferry, taking you from the islands of Pargas to the Nagu main islands. The ferry ride is free of charge and it takes approximately 8 min to cross. The Pargas–Nagu ferry crosses 2–4 times per hour in each direction during the day and around once an hour during the night.

There are several daily coach connections by the Archipelago Bus between Turku and Nagu. The Archipelago Bus operates year-round.

The Archipelago Trails

During the summer season two tourist routes that can be travelled by car, bus, motorcycle or bike open in the region. Both of these so-called trails connect Turku with the archipelago area and both of them go through the centre of Nagu. Each trail includes one ferry passage that is not free of charge. The Archipelago Trail covers a big part of the Turku area archipelago, while the Small Archipelago Trail makes a short cut over the island of Själö in Nagu. Besides the centre of Nagu itself, the small island of Själö, with its tragic history as a disclosed island for lepers and the mentally ill, has grown into the main touristic site of Nagu. The ferry from the central harbour of Nagu to Själö takes 20 minutes.

St Olav Waterway

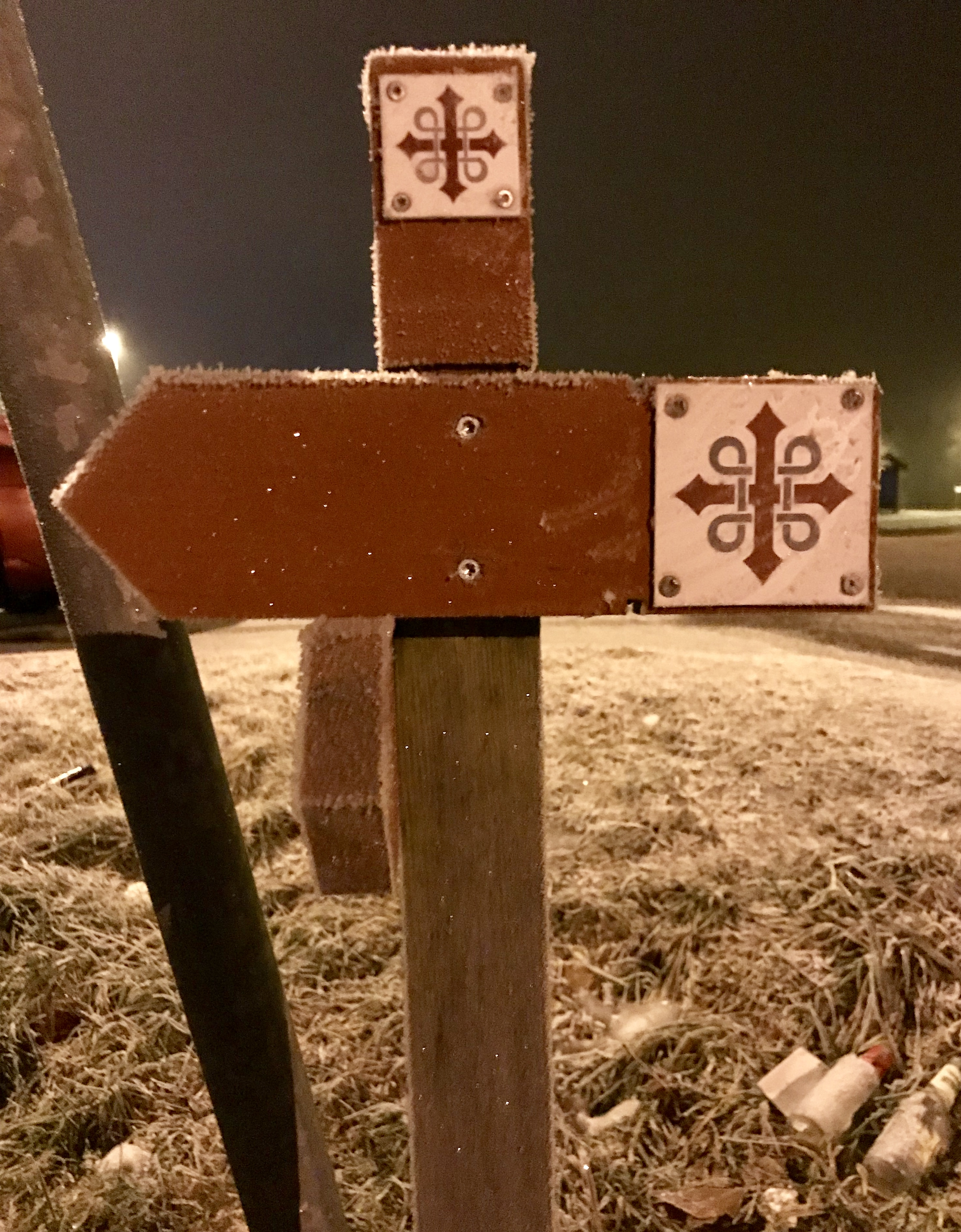
Symbol of the Olav ways. (Picture taken in Norway.)

Nagu is situated by the St Olav Waterway route, a part of the Scandinavian St Olav pilgrimage trails that end in Trondheim, Norway. St Olav Waterway is the first route in Finland to have been accepted as a Cultural Route of the European Council (from 6.12.2018) and it is most probably the world's first water based pilgrimage route (another was under process in Northern Portugal as a part of el Camino to Santiago de Compostela in 2017). All the water-based transportation that Nagu has to offer: kayaking, yachting, motor boating and island hopping can be implemented into a trip along the St Olav Waterway – besides walking across the islands.

== See also ==
- Ominainen (Ominaisholmen), a historical burial island
- Själö (Seili), an island in North-East
- Vrouw Maria – a shipwreck located in Nagu
