= Storlandet =

Coordinates: 60°11′N 21°47′E

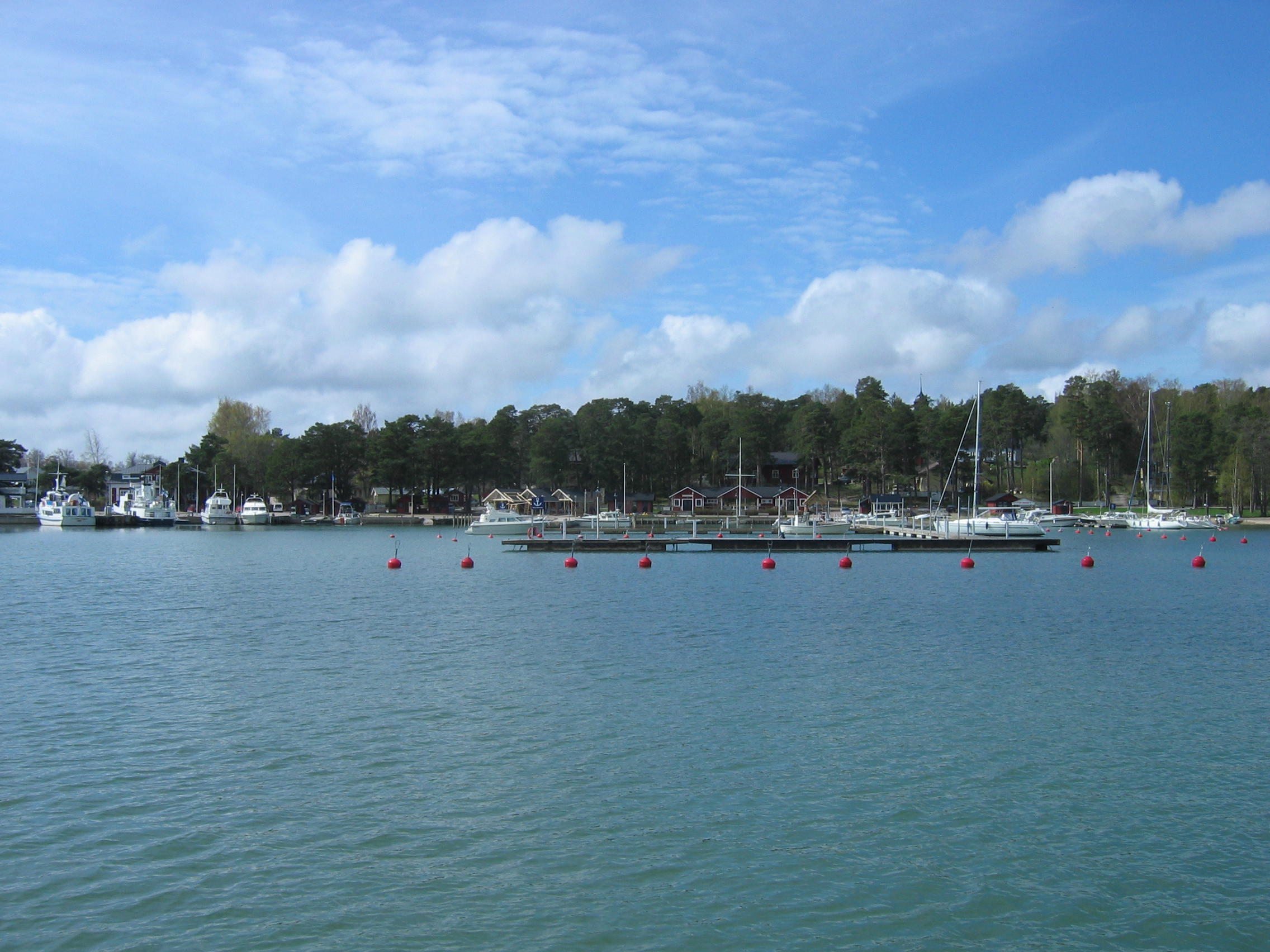
The harbour Storlanet island, Finland

Storlandet (Finnish: Iso-Nauvo) is the main island of the former Nagu municipality (now part of Pargas, Southwest Finland) in Western Finland. It has an area of 72 square kilometres (28 mi^{2}).

Storlandet is home to the medieval Nagu Church. Constructed in the mid-15th century, this stone church is dedicated to Saint Olaf and features historical artifacts, including a crucifix from the early 15th century.
