= Själö =

Island in Nagu, Finland

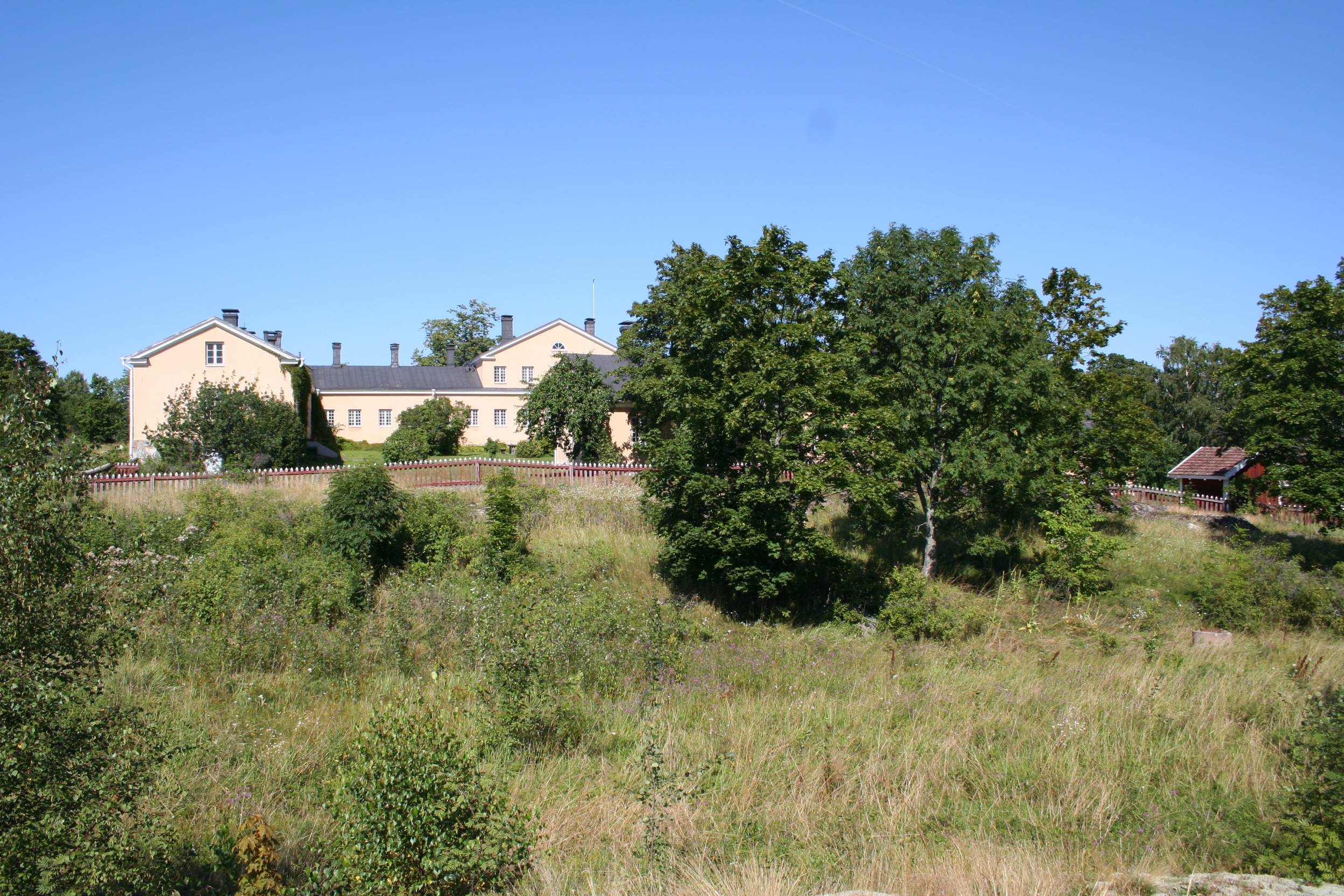
Former hospital

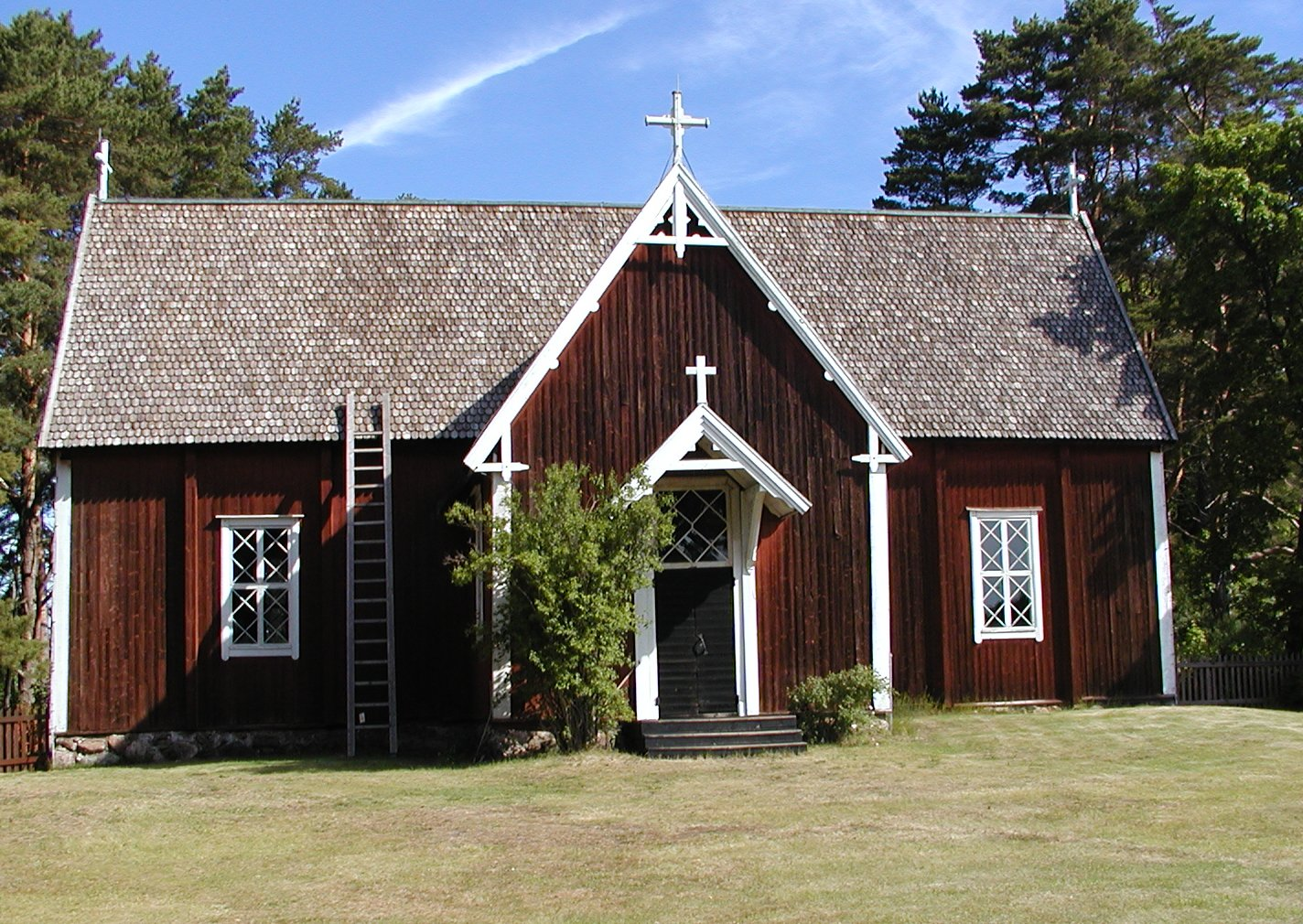
Själö Church

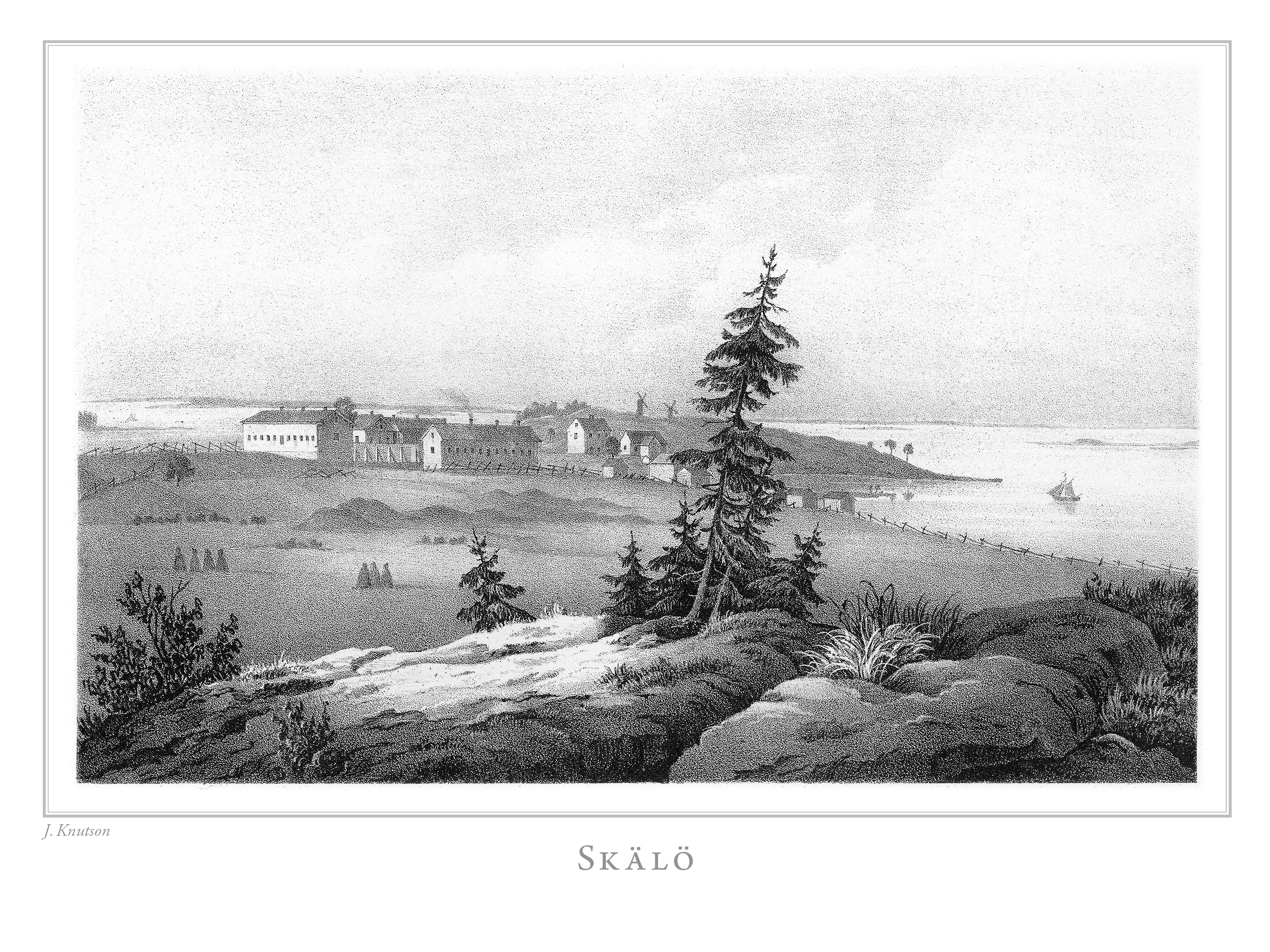
Illustration in Finland framstäldt i teckningar edited by Zacharias Topelius and published 1845-1852.

Själö or Nagu Själö (in Swedish) or Seili (in Finnish) is a small island (about 2 kilometres (1.2 miles) from north to south), off the main islands of Nagu, in the Archipelago Sea, off the south west coast of Finland. Själö is part of the municipality of Pargas. The island is known for its church and nature, a research institute and a former hospital.

There is another Själö in Väståboland, on the border between the former municipalities of Houtskär and Iniö.

Asteroid 2292 Seili has been named after the island.

== History ==
The Finnish name of the island, Seili, is a corruption of the Swedish Själö ('seal island' in English, själ being the old form of säl, or seal). The name indicates that the island has been a retreat for seals and an attraction for seal hunters in early times. Actually Själö, then and at least until the 18th century, comprised two islands separated by a shallow strait, which has disappeared because of the land rising from the sea, an after-effect of glacial compression during the last ice age.

The first hospital on Själö was established in the 1620s. Before that there were two farms on the islands belonging to the Crown and thus available when the authorities looked for a suitable island to which the leper hospital at the outskirts of Turku could be moved.

According to a Royal Decree in 1619 by King Gustavus Adolphus of Sweden, the buildings of the hospital in Turku, with the exception of the chapel, were burned down and the inmates transported to Själö. The Själö hospital for lepers was dedicated to St George. The last leper patient died in 1785, and the establishment on Själö became a hospital or a place of confinement for mentally afflicted people until 1962. The hospital was self-sufficient with agriculture, and fishing. The present-day buildings on the island, with the exception of the chapel (built 1733) and the rectory (built 1791), date from the 19th and the 20th centuries, and most of them have been built for the mental hospital. (source: E-M Vilho).

Currently the island hosts the Archipelago Research Institute that is a part of the University of Turku. The research is focused on the surrounding Archipelago Sea as well as the whole Baltic Sea.

== Harbours ==
There is one small harbour, on the east side for the visitors (60°14′36″N 021°57′54″E) and on the west side for the ferry (60°14′07″N 021°57′13″E).

== Själö in popular culture ==
Seili, a Finnish-language pop album by Jenni Vartiainen, is named after the island's Finnish name.

Johanna Holmström's 2017 novel Själarnas ö (Island of Souls) is set on the island.

Katja Kallio's 2017 book, Yön kantaja, takes place on the island. The book's movie adaptation, Tell Everyone, released in 2026 and was directed by Alli Haapasalo.
