= Emäsalo =

Village in Porvoo, Finland

Coordinates: 60°15′N 025°37′E

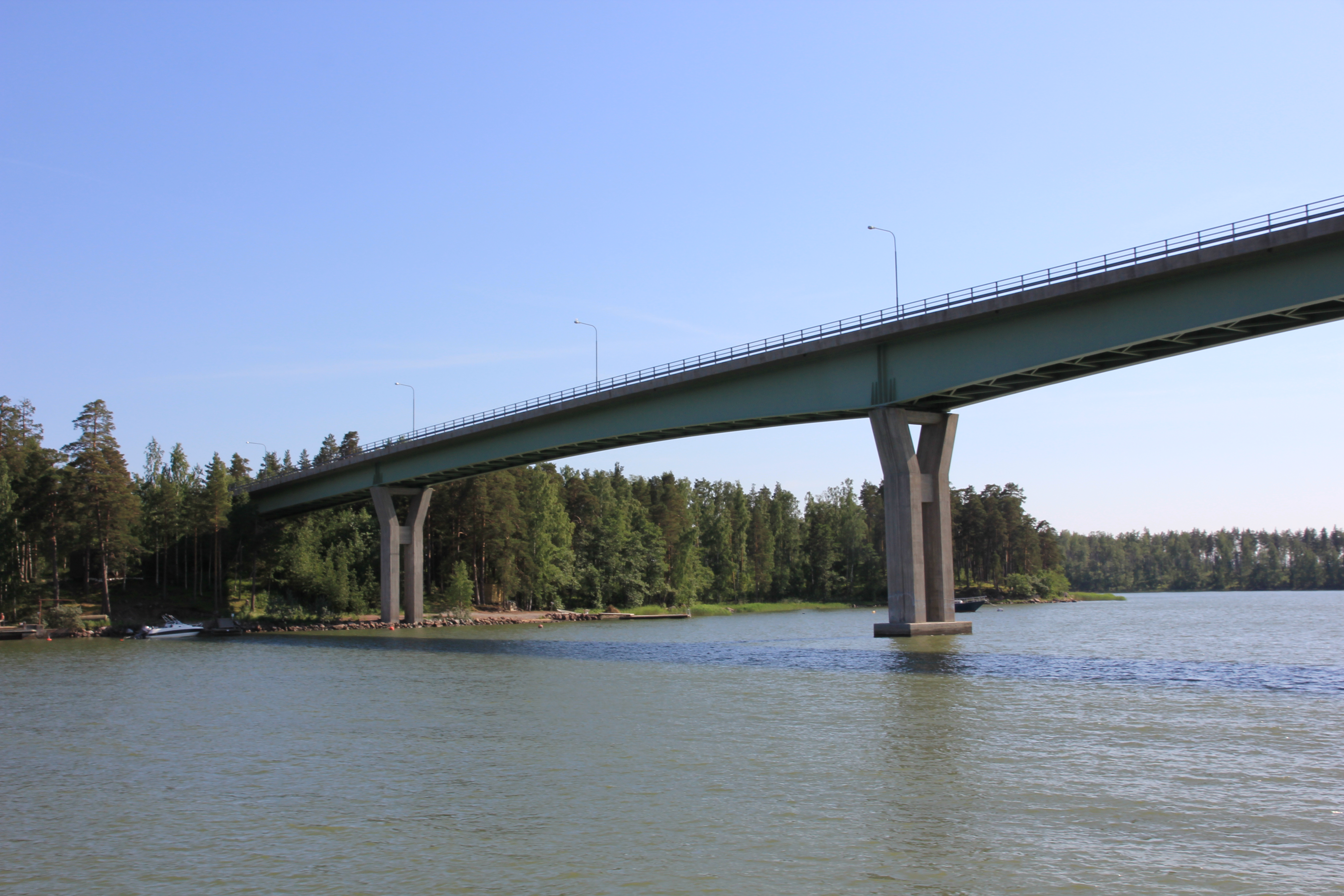
Bridge between Emäsalo and the main land

Emäsalo (Swedish: Emsalö) is an island and a village in the city of Porvoo in Southern Finland. The population is approximately 400, but during summer many people come to spend their holidays at their summer cottages on the island. The majority of the population are Swedish-speaking Finns.

The island has had a bridge connected to the Finland mainland since 1992.

Emäsalo is divided into four villages; Emsalö By, Orrby, Bengstby and Varlax. In the largest village, Bengstby, there is a small grocery store and a post office. In Varlax there is a weather- and sea-monitoring station.
