= Ålön =

Island in Finland

Ålön (Finnish: Ålönsaari), with Flatskär, Prästnäs, and Tippan is an island in Finland. The island is located in the municipality of Pargas in the province of Southwest Finland, in the southern part of the country, 150 km west of the capital city of Helsinki. The island's area is 70.17 square kilometers, and its greatest length is 12 kilometers in the east–west direction.

Parga's center is mostly located on Ålön. The open pit that gave rise to Nordkalk and related industries is also located here. Most of the island is still rural.

== Merged sub-islands ==
- Ålön 60.30289°N 22.20972°E
- Flatskär 60.28357°N 22.20126°E
- Prästnäs 60.28482°N 22.20466°E
- Tippan 60.27559°N 22.12354°E

== Climate ==
Inland climate prevails in the area. Annual average temperaturein the area is 3 °C. The warmest month is July, when the average temperature is 18 °C, and the coldest is February, with −10 °C.
