= Vätö Church =

Coordinates: 59°49′00″N 18°55′02″E

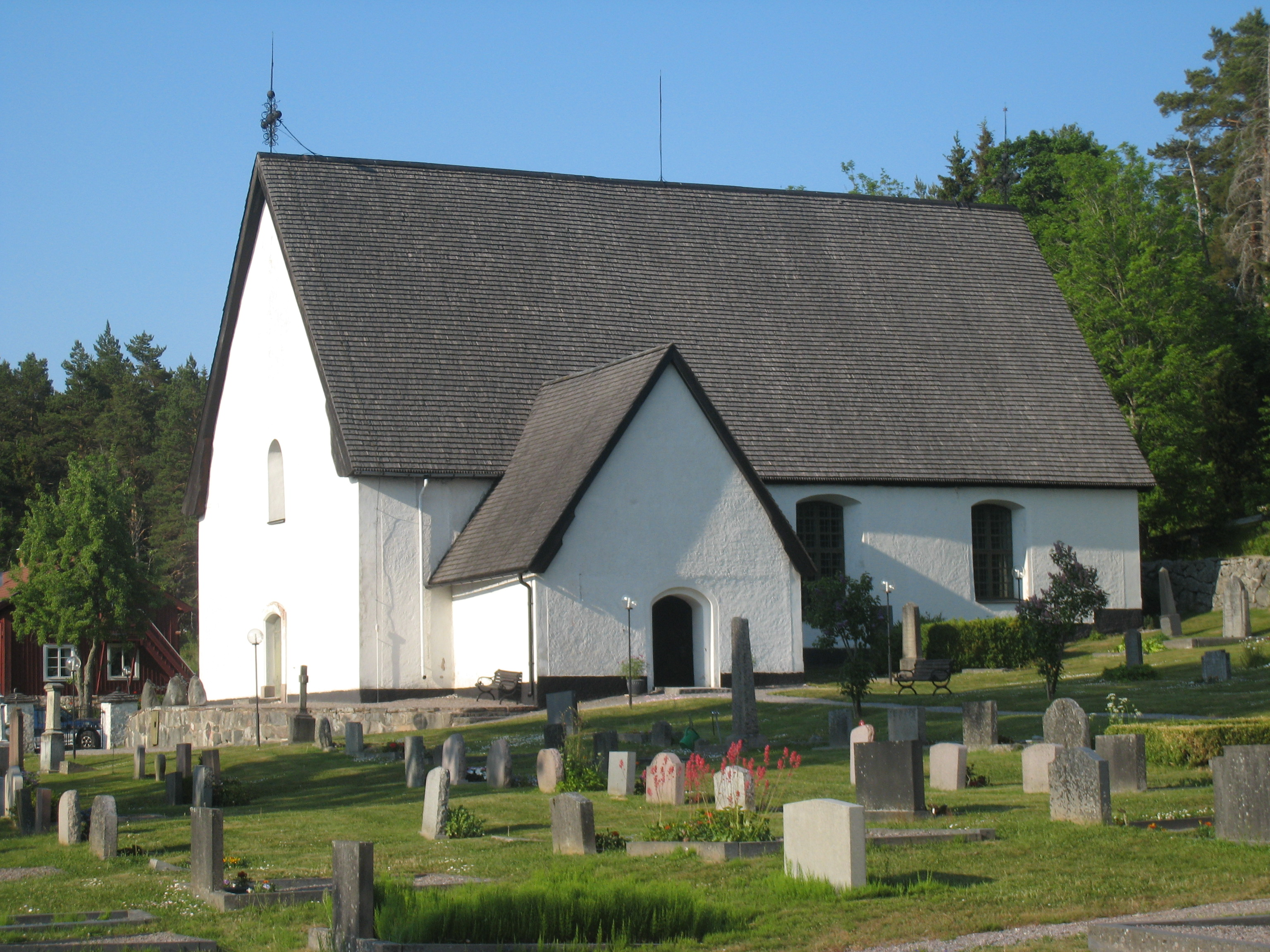
Vätö Church, view of the exterior

Vätö Church (Swedish: Vätö kyrka) is a medieval church in Vätö in Stockholm County, Sweden. It is part of the Archdiocese of Uppsala (Church of Sweden).

== History and architecture ==
The church is mentioned in written sources for the first time in 1337 and was built earlier in the same century. The vaults supporting the ceiling were constructed in the 15th century. They are profusely decorated with frescos in a style reminiscent of Albertus Pictor and probably dates from the last quarter of the 15th century. The church porch was also built at around the same time. Among the church furnishings, the baptismal font is unusual and originally belonged to Nydala Abbey in Småland. The church also has a 16th-century wooden sculpture depicting Saint George and the Dragon, a piece of art inspired by the Saint George and the Dragon in Stockholm made by Bernt Notke. A triumphal cross that earlier belonged to Vätö Church is today on display at the Swedish History Museum.
