= Bolshoy Beryozovy Island =

Island in Gulf of Finland, Russia

Coordinates: 60.3°N 28.62°E

Bolshoy Beryozovy (Russian: Большой Берёзовый; Finnish: Koivistonsaari), alternatively spelled Bolshoy Berezovy, is the largest of the Beryozovye Islands in the Gulf of Finland in Leningrad Oblast, Russia. The island is situated near the Karelian Isthmus, outside the town of Primorsk.
