= Hemsön =

Island of Sweden

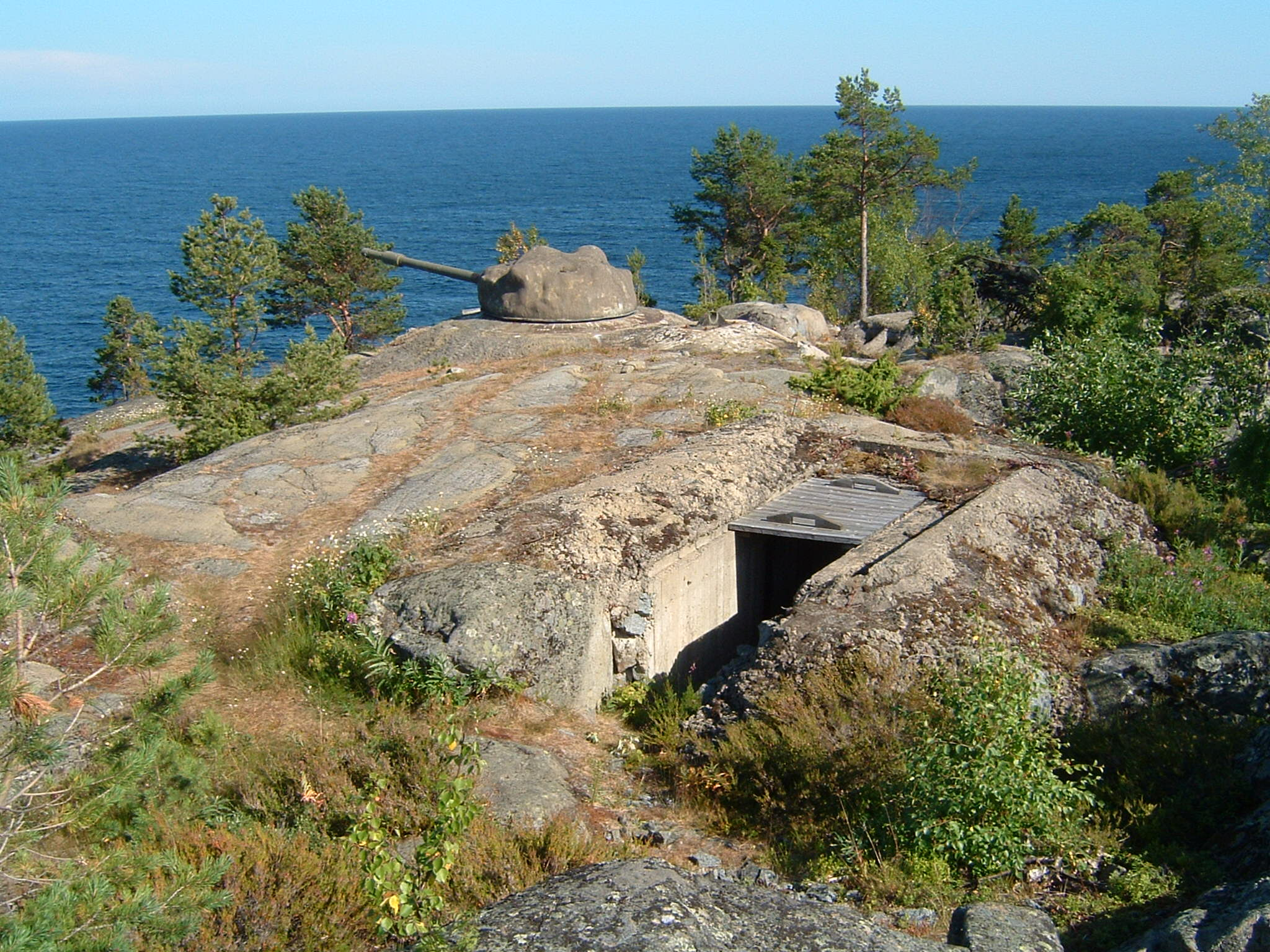
- Hemsö fortress
- Interactive map of Hemsön

Geography
- Location: Bothnian Sea
- Coordinates: 62°43′N 18°04′E
- Area: 54.39 km^{2} (21.00 sq mi)

Administration
- Sweden
- County: Västernorrland

Hemsön is an island in the Bothnian Sea, northeast of Härnösand, at the mouth of the Ångerman River. The area is 54 km² and the population is 140 (2006).
