= Vätö =

Island in the Norrtälje archipelago

Coordinates: 59°48′N 18°57′E

== Geography ==
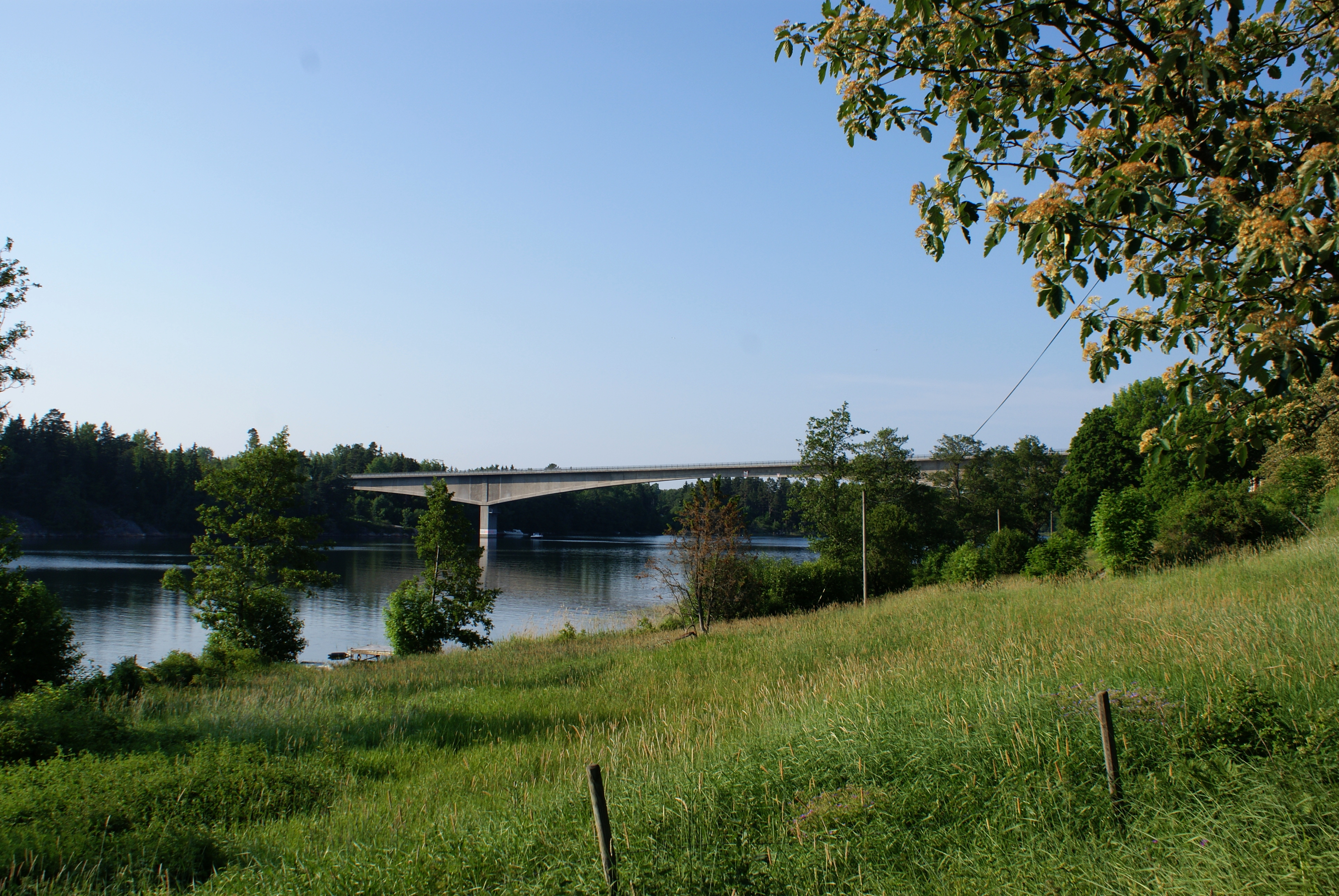
Vätö bridge and the island's west shore

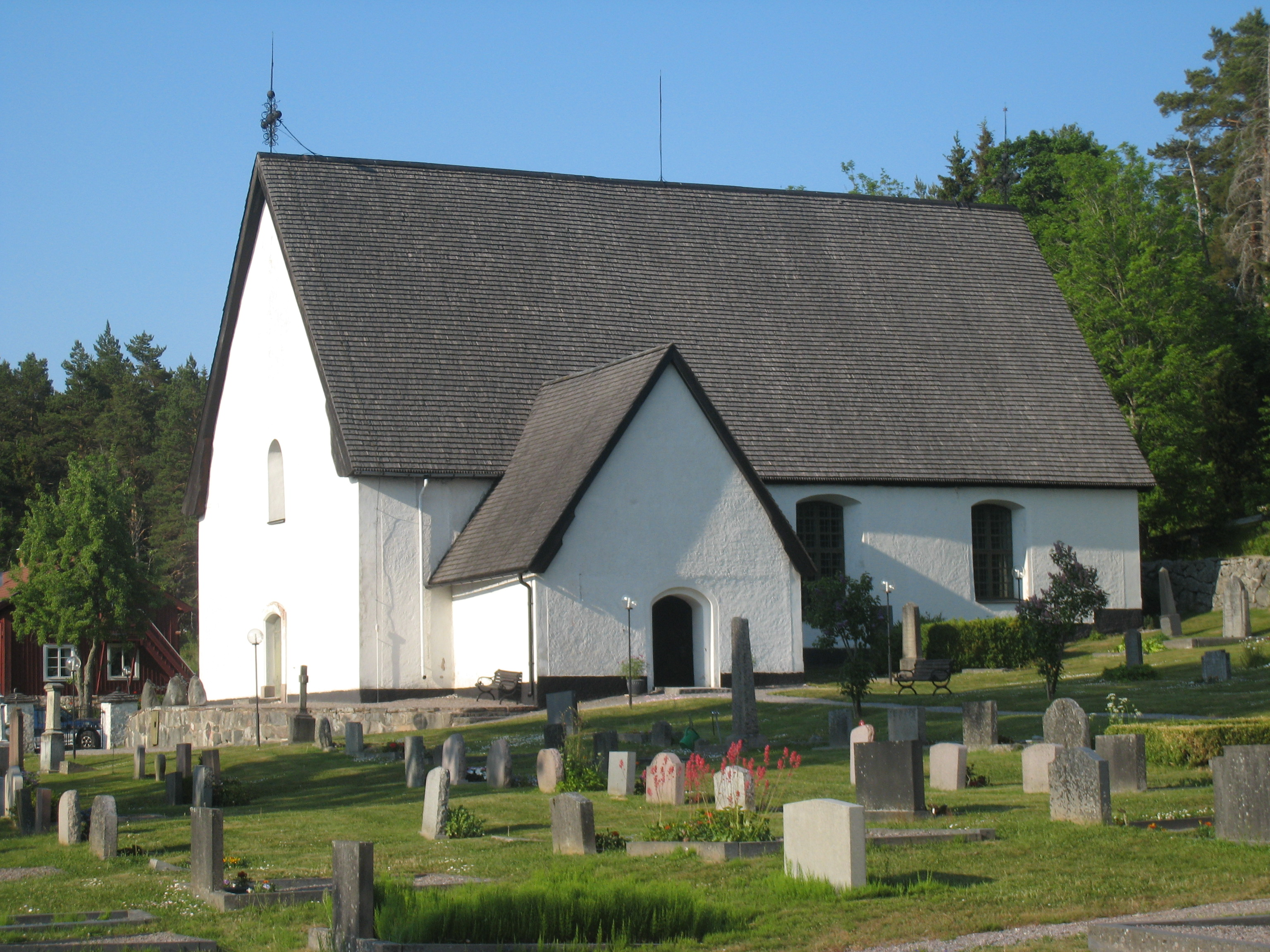
The 14th century Vätö church

Vätö is an island in the Norrtälje archipelago, situated about 10 kilometres (6.2 mi) east of the town of Norrtälje. It has a roughly triangular shape, with a length of 9 kilometres (5.6 mi) north to south and up to 4 kilometres (2.5 mi) east to west.

== Population ==
The island has a permanent population of around 1,200 people who live in a number of small villages and individual homesteads. The largest of the villages is Harg, situated at Vätö's centre.

== Information ==
A bridge connects Vätö to the mainland. Medieval Vätö Church is situated near the bridge and is decorated with 15th century frescoes painted by an unknown artist.

Vätö's red granite, which is over 1.7 billion years old, is renowned as a building material. It was extensively quarried from the late 19th century to provide stone for a number of monuments, including the Royal Swedish Opera and the Riksdag building. The last of the old quarries was shut down in the 1970s. Limited quarrying resumed in the 1980s in Vätö Stenhuggeri quarry, which was first opened in 1905 and can be visited by tourists. Another quarry, Vätöberg, has been designated as a national monument.
