= List of islands of Finland =

Within Finland's borders there are 789 islands of over 1 km^{2} area. Most of these are inhabited, and have road connection to the mainland. There are altogether 75,818 islands that have over 0.5 km^{2} area in Finland and with all the smaller isles, the total number of islands in Finland is 178,947. There are 549 permanently inhabited islands in Finland with no road connection to the mainland. Many other islands are used nearly permanently for recreational purposes.

== Largest islands by the sea ==
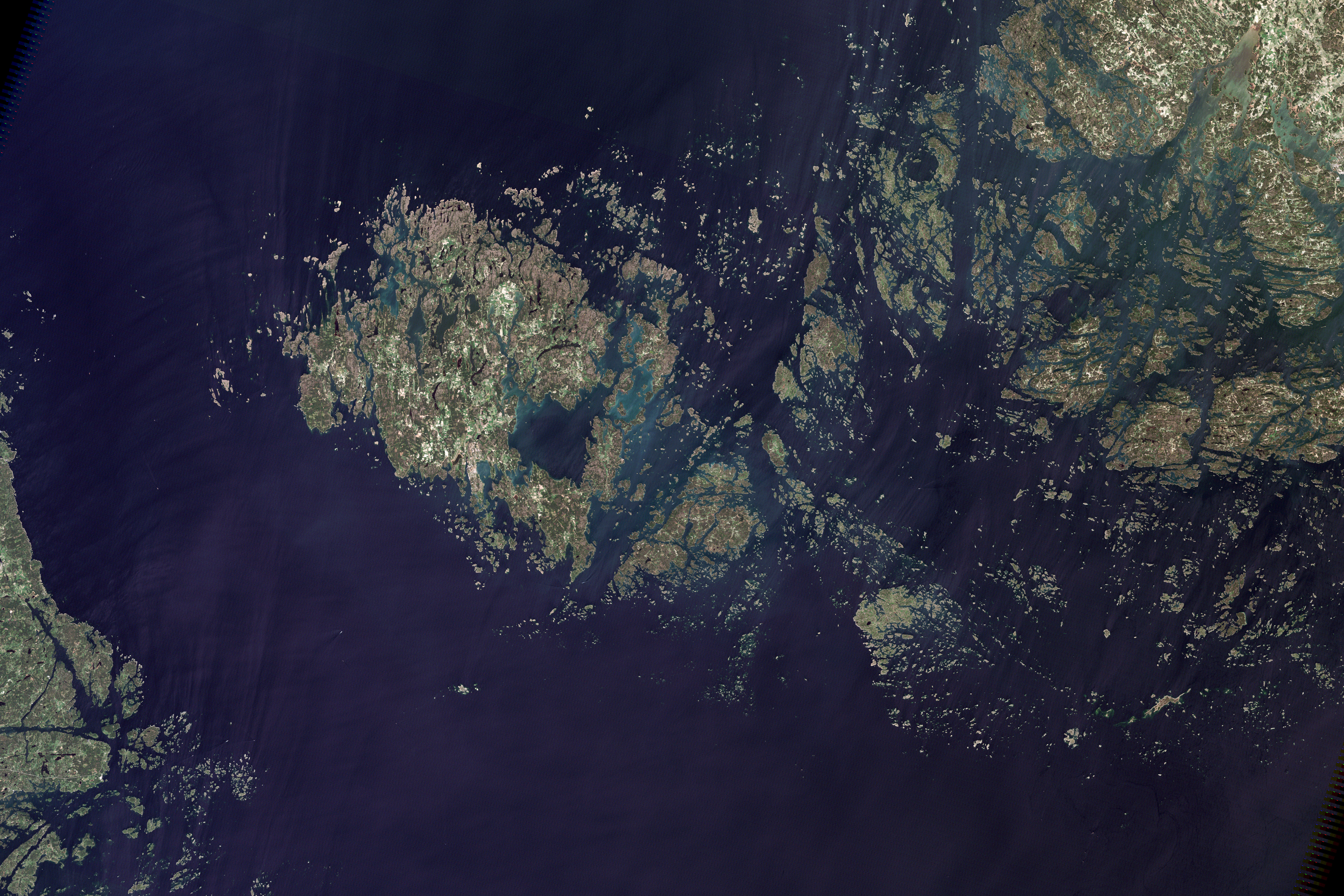
Åland islands and Archipelago Sea

Island	Area (km^{2})
Fasta Åland	685
Kimitoön	524
Hailuoto	195
Replot	160
Otava	105
Lemland	92
Eckerö	91
Öja	90
Storlandet	72
Ålön	70
Kyrklandet	64
Kivimaa	57
Pyhämaa	53
Vessölandet	52
Kirjalansaari	49
Oxkangar	46
Lillandet	38
Stortervolandet	37
Larsmo	37
Kaurissalo	36

== Largest islands in lakes ==
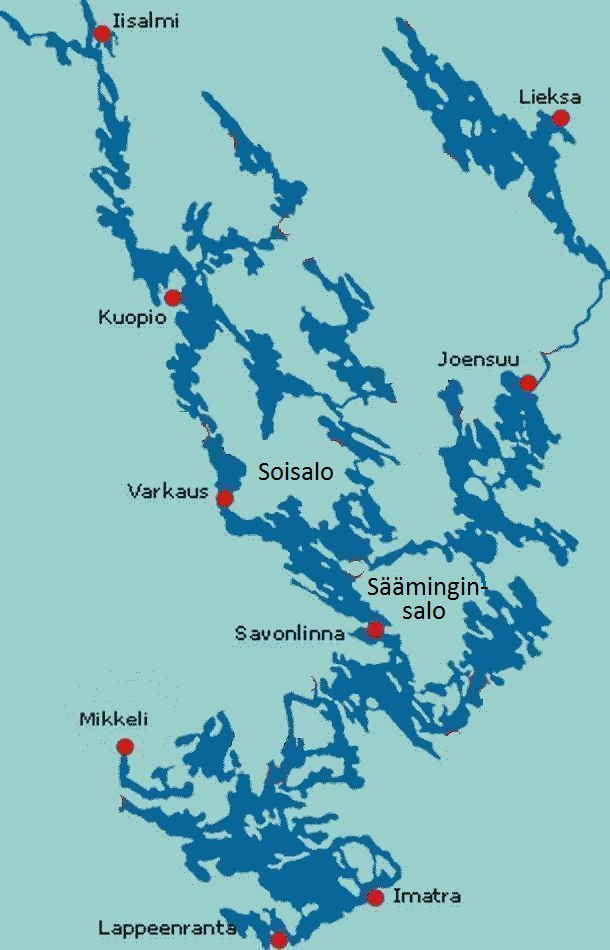
Soisalo and Sääminginsalo

Island	Area (km^{2})
Soisalo	1,638
Sääminginsalo	1,069
Hurissalo	174
Partalansaari	170
Viljakansaari	115
Manamansalo	76
Äitsaari	74
Moinniemensaari	53
Oravisalo	49
Kirkkosaari	47
Väisälänsaari	35
Virmaila	35
Kuivainen	33
Pyylinsaari	28
Varpasalo	27
Paalasmaa	27
Salosaari	26
Judinsalo	25
Lintusalo	25
Kyläniemi	23

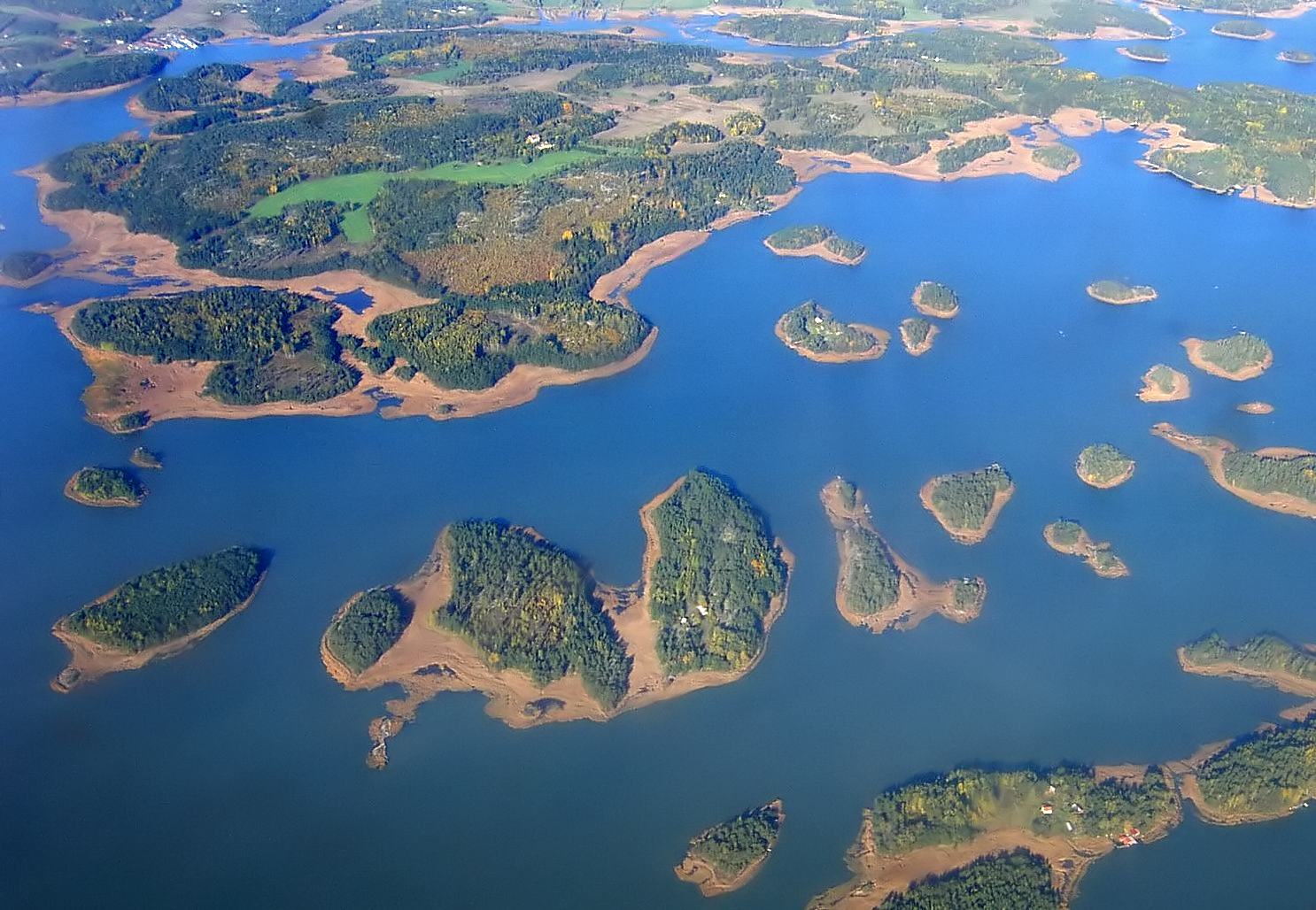
Archipelago Sea has more than 40,000 islands and islets

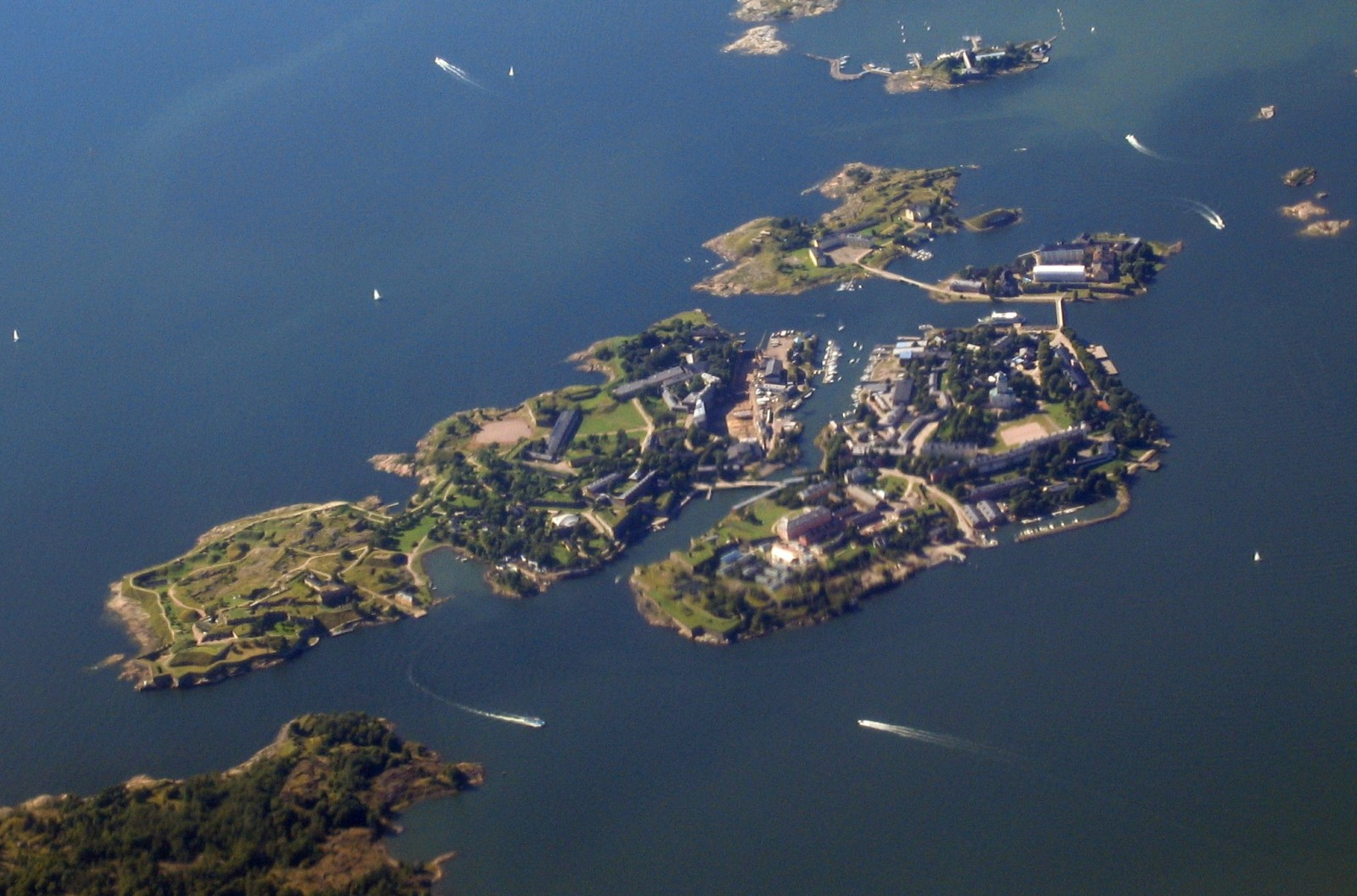
Aerial view of Suomenlinna

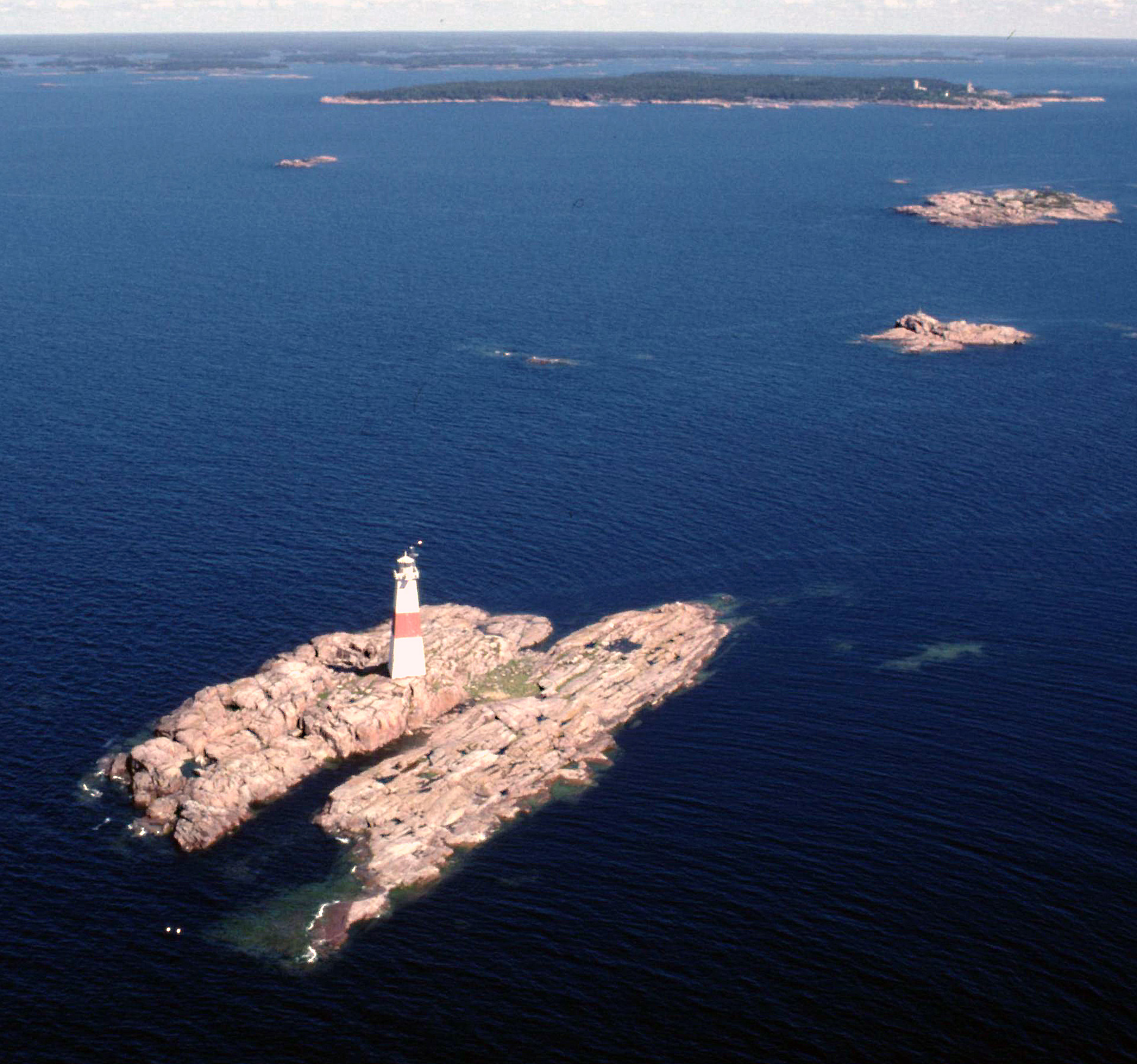
A light house on Jussarö

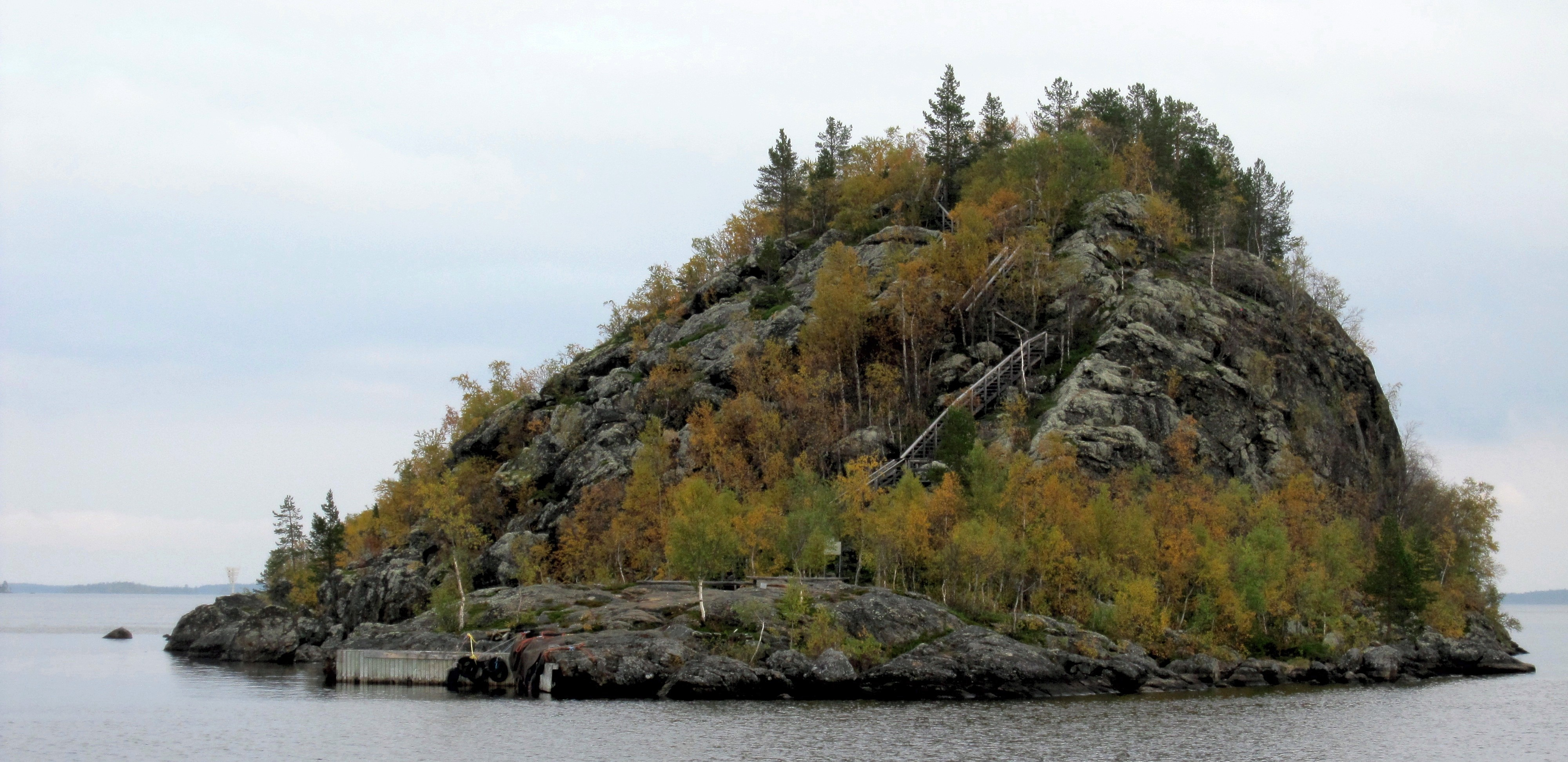
Ukonkivi island

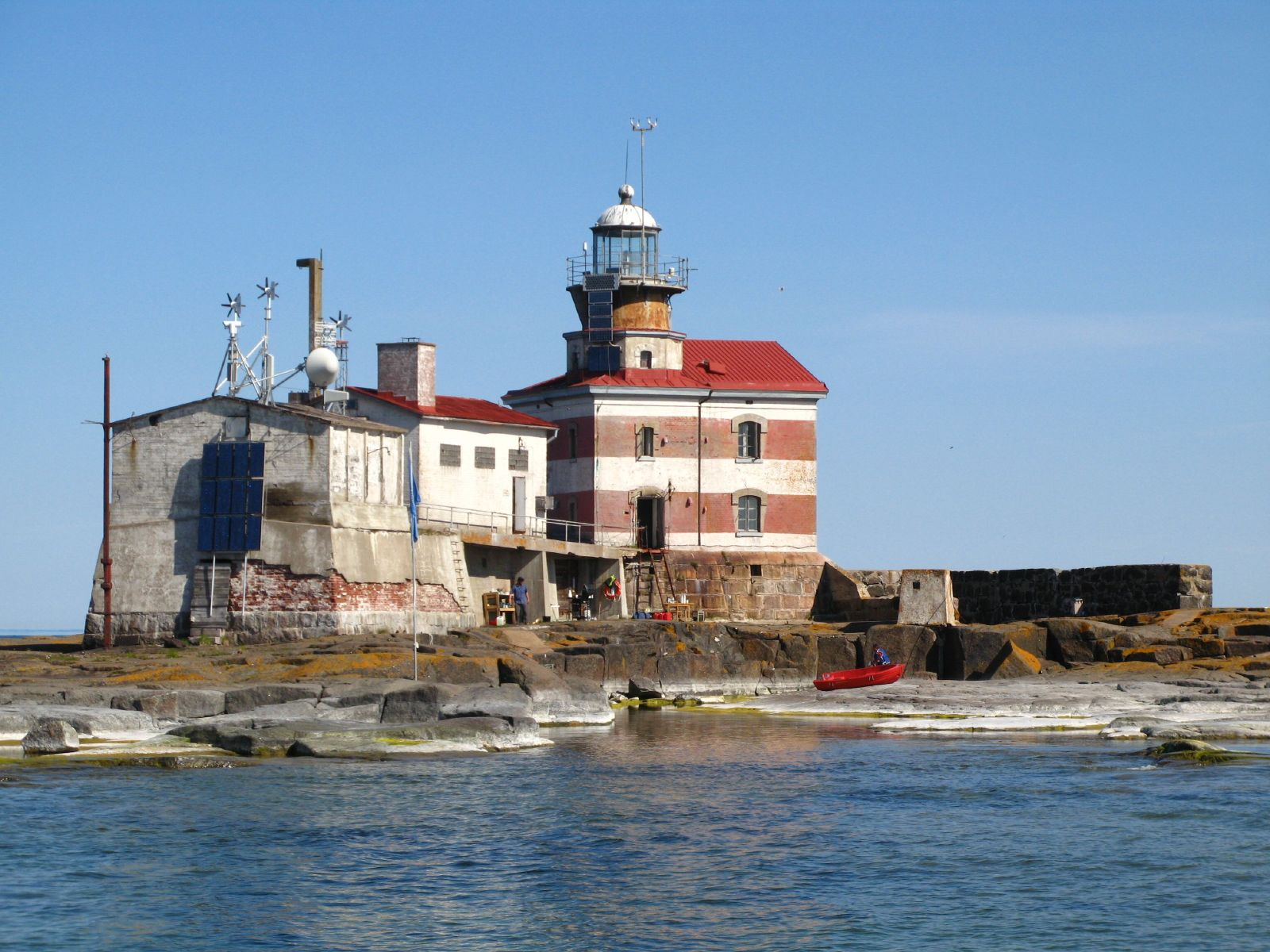
Märket Lighthouse

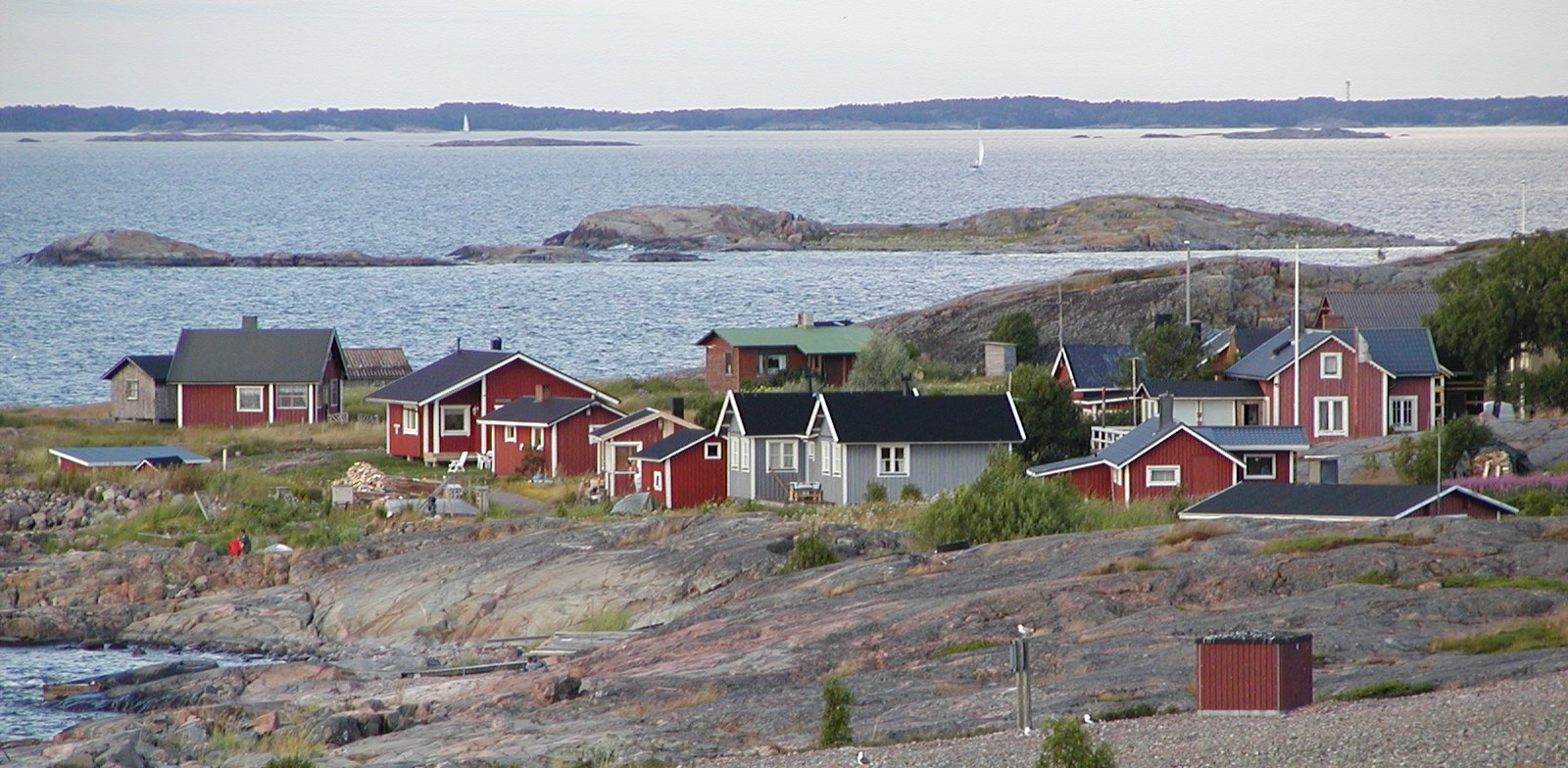
A fishing village in Jurmo

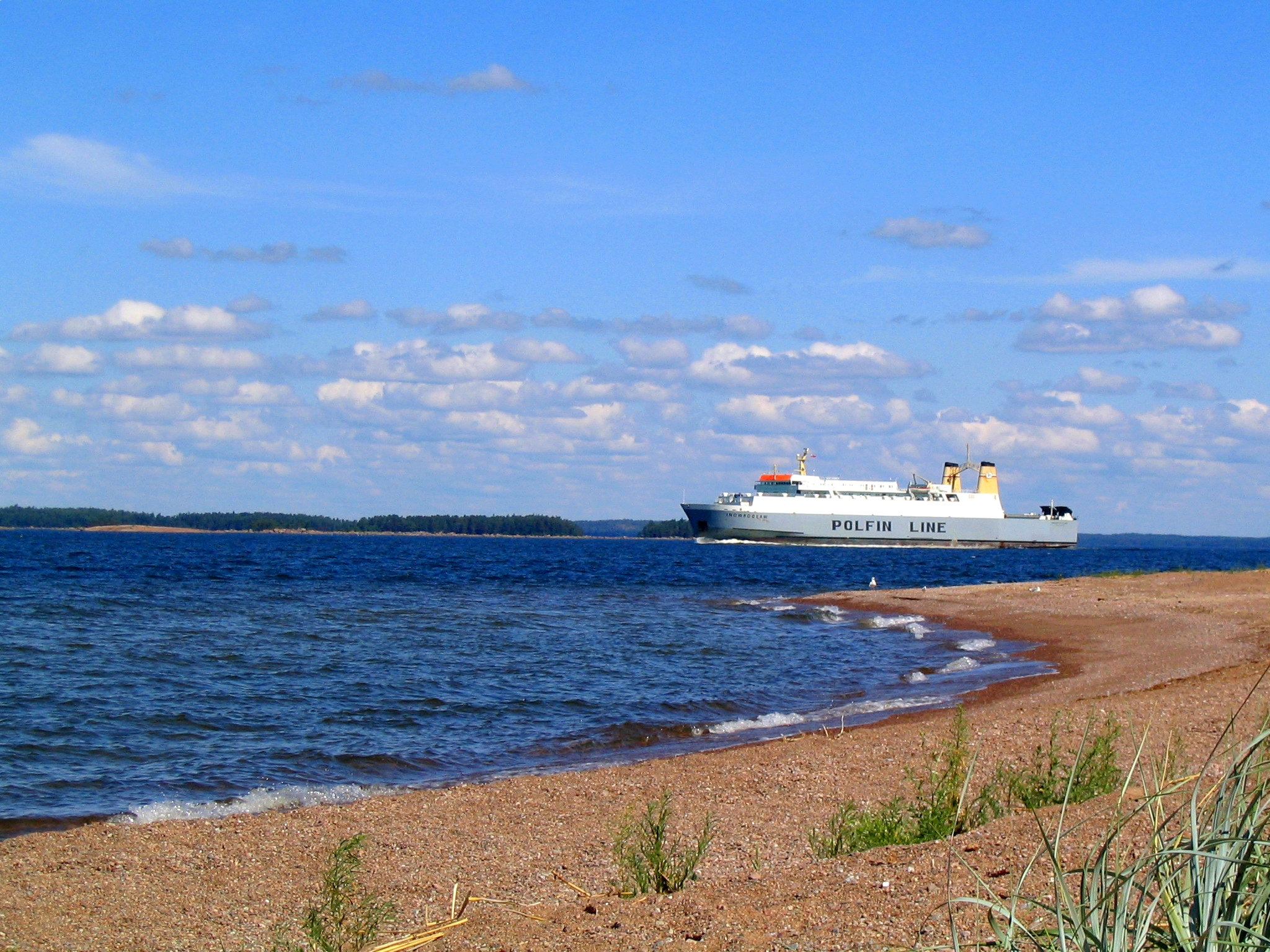
A sandy beach of Kaunissaari

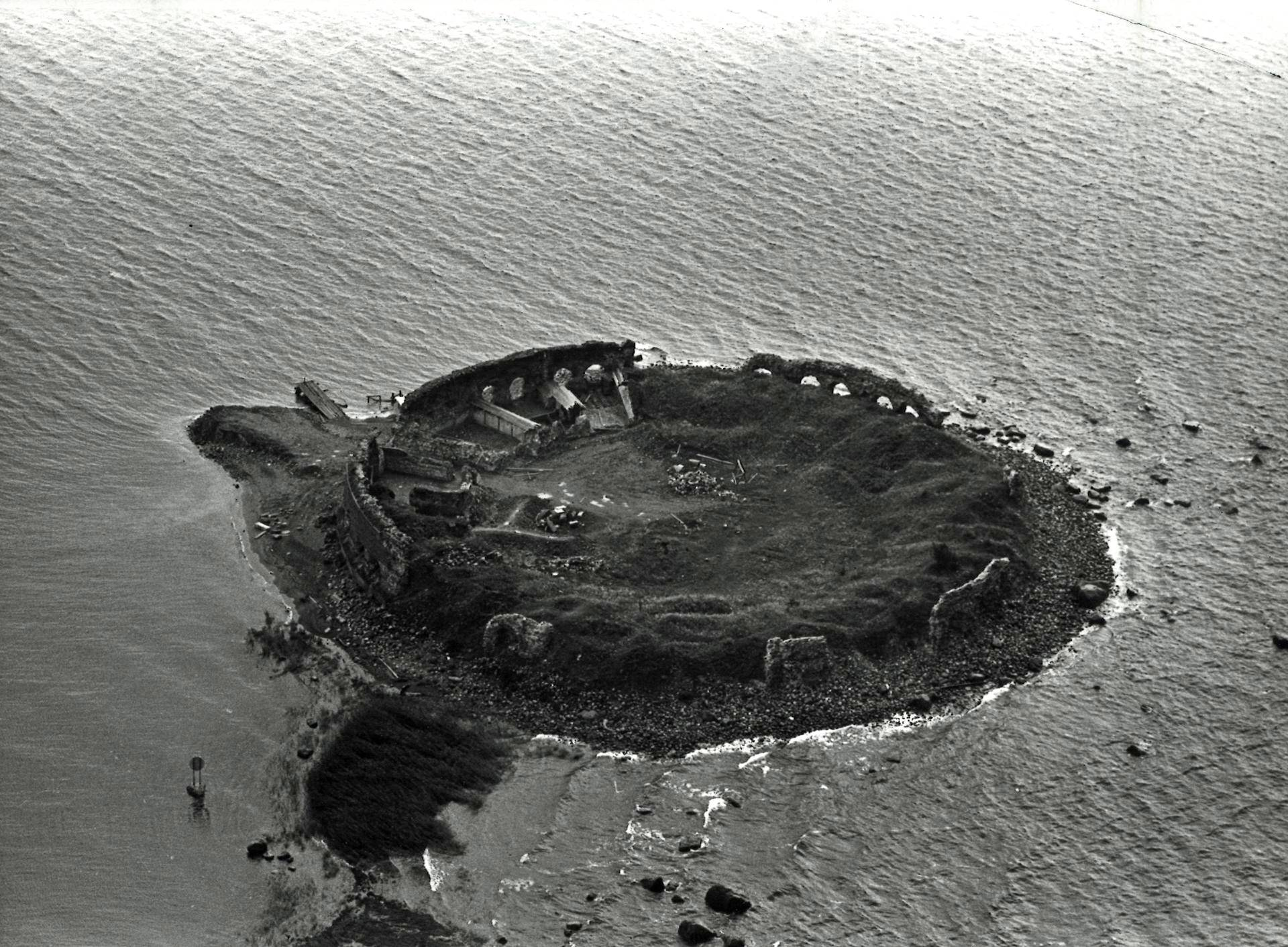
Ruotsinsalmi sea fortress on Kukouri island near Kotka

== See also ==
- List of islands in the Baltic Sea
- List of islands
- Archipelago Sea
