= Eila Pellinen =

Finnish singer

Eila Pellinen or Eila Reima (6 August 1938, in Sulkava, Finland – 10 April 1977, in Espoo) was a Finnish singer. Her song "Onni jonka annoin pois" (The Luck I Gave Away) was a hit.

== Discography ==
- Tuula ja Eila (1957)
- Eila Pellistä tapaamassa (1958)
- Eila ja Jorma (1959)
- Eila Pellinen (1977)
- Unohtumattomat (1993)
- Kultaiset korvarenkaat (1998)
