= Partalansaari =

Island of Finland

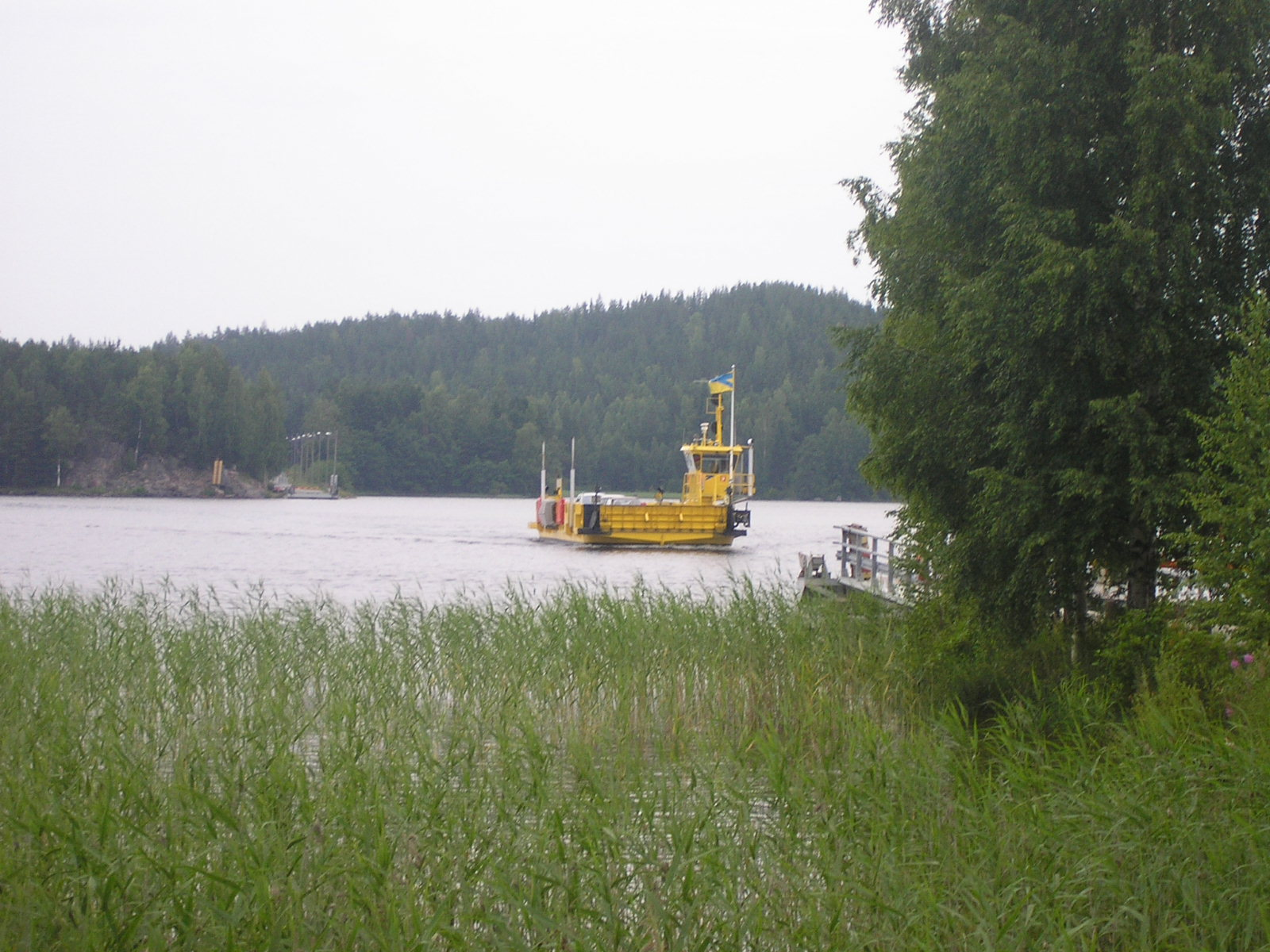
- Kietävälä ferry in Kaartilankoski, Partalansaari.
- Interactive map of Partalansaari

Geography
- Coordinates: 61°40′30″N 28°22′30″E
- Area: 170 km^{2} (66 sq mi)
- Municipality: Sulkava; Puumala

Partalansaari is an island located in lake Saimaa. A large portion of the island belongs to the municipality of Sulkava while a smaller part belongs to Puumala.

The island is surrounded by the largest watersheds — on the east is Lepistönselkä, on the northwest is Enonvesi and on the southwest Haapaselkä. There are more than 80 lakes and ponds within the island and the largest are lakes Kulkemusjärvi and Saajuu. The island has a road connection to the mainland. The villages that are covered by the municipality of Sulkava are Kaartilankoski in the north, Karjulanmäki in the west and Auvila in the southeast. Puumala includes the villages of Keriniemi and Kietävälä. The island has approximately 400 permanent residents. There are a lot of summer residents as well.

A book about Partalansaari — Partalansaaren poluilla — was published in 1999. It was written by Rauno Pelkonen, a former resident of the island.

The 60-kilometer route of Sulkavan Suursoudut (The Grand Rowing Races of Sulkava), revolves around Partalansaari. Halfway through the trip lies the Varviranta accommodation area, where tour rowers stay overnight.

== History ==
Partalansaari has been inhabited since the prehistoric times. Many Stone Age settlements were found in Sulkava.

Partanlasaari was formerly known as Kulkemussalo island and it was later abbreviated to Kulkemussaari.

== Gallery ==
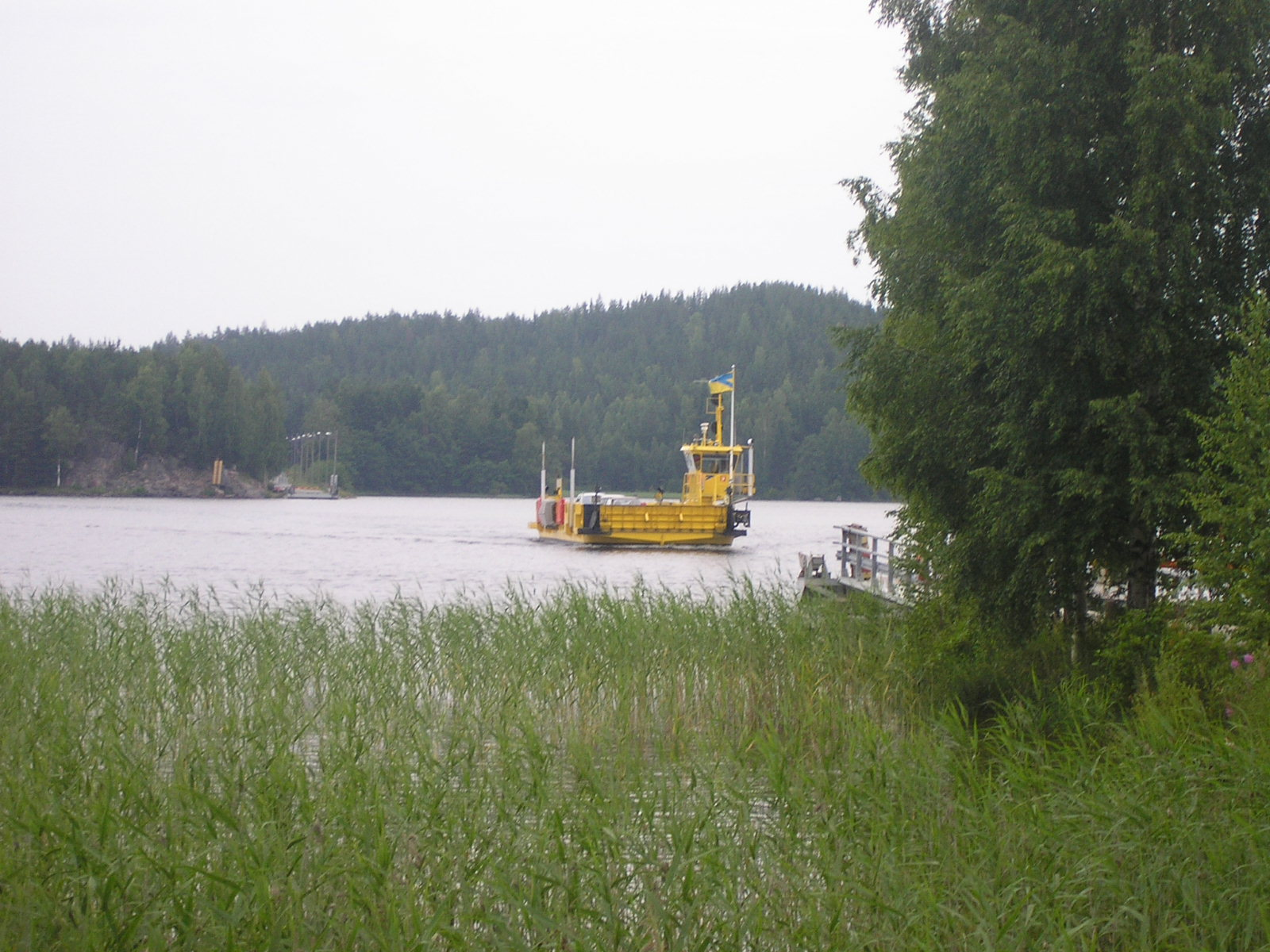
Kietävälä ferry in Kaartilankoski, Partalansaari

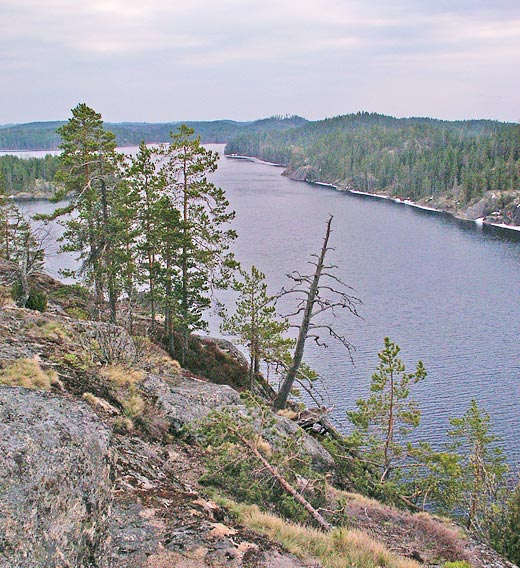
A view from Linnavuori (ancient fortress) of Sulkava
