= Sulkava =

- Municipality
- Sulkavan kunta Sulkava kommun
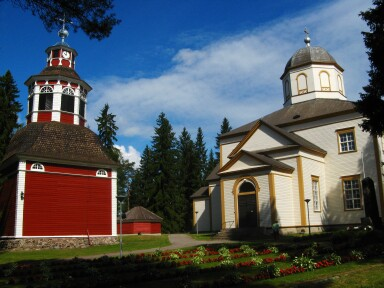
- Sulkava church

- Coat of arms

- Location of Sulkava in Finland
- Interactive map of Sulkava
- Coordinates: 61°47′N 028°22′E
- Country: Finland
- Region: South Savo
- Sub-region: Savonlinna
- Charter: 1630

Government
  - Municipal manager: Rinna Ikola-Norrbacka

Area (2018-01-01)
  - Total: 769.20 km^{2} (296.99 sq mi)
  - Land: 584.42 km^{2} (225.65 sq mi)
  - Water: 184.52 km^{2} (71.24 sq mi)
  - Rank: 144th largest in Finland

Population (2025-12-31)
  - Total: 2,310
  - Rank: 240th largest in Finland
  - Density: 3.95/km^{2} (10.2/sq mi)

Population by native language
  - Finnish: 94.6% (official)
  - Others: 5.4%

Population by age
  - 0 to 14: 8.2%
  - 15 to 64: 52.5%
  - 65 or older: 39.4%
- Time zone: UTC+02:00 (EET)
  - Summer (DST): UTC+03:00 (EEST)
- Website: sulkava.fi/en/

Sulkava is a municipality of Finland. It is located in the South Savo region. The municipality has a population of 2,310 (31 December 2025) and covers an area of 769.20 square kilometres (296.99 sq mi) of which 184.52 km^{2} (71.24 sq mi) is water. The population density is 3.95 inhabitants per square kilometre (10.2/sq mi).

Neighbouring municipalities are Juva, Puumala, Rantasalmi, Ruokolahti and Savonlinna. The municipality is unilingually Finnish.

Sulkava is one of 25 municipalities in Finland where one in five detached houses stands empty. It has been estimated that if current trends continue, it will take only a few decades before Sulkava consists entirely of abandoned houses.

The municipality is best known for the annual long distance rowing contest, Sulkavan Suursoudut, around Partalansaari ("Partala Island") on lake Saimaa.

== Notable people ==
- Eila Pellinen
- Kalevi Hämäläinen
- Timo Rautiainen
- Albin Savola

== Gallery ==
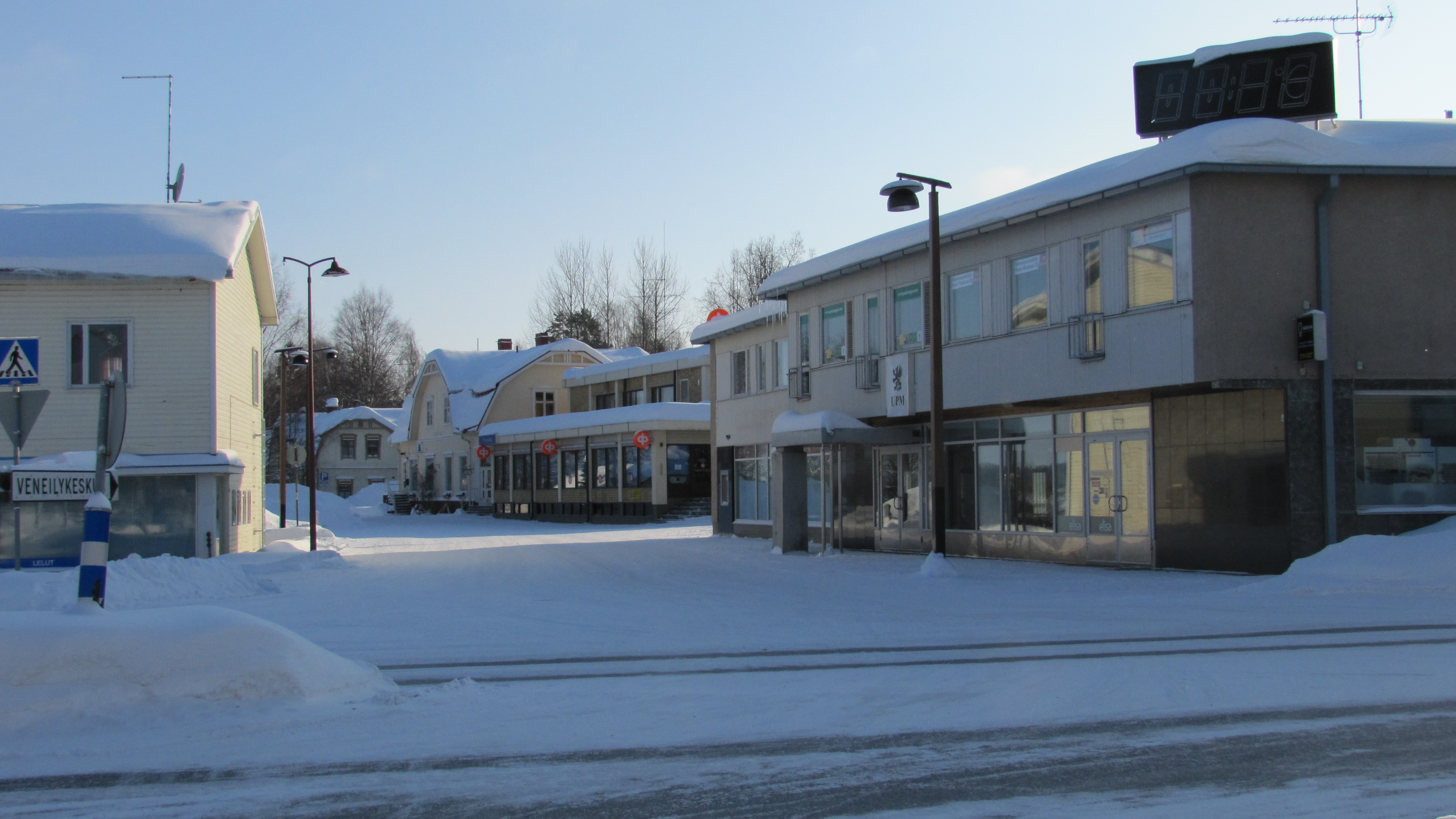
Sulkava centre during winter

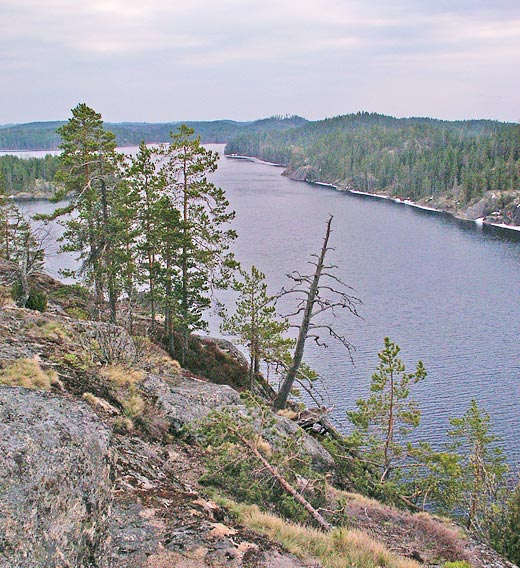
A view from Sulkava Hill Fort (Linnavuori)

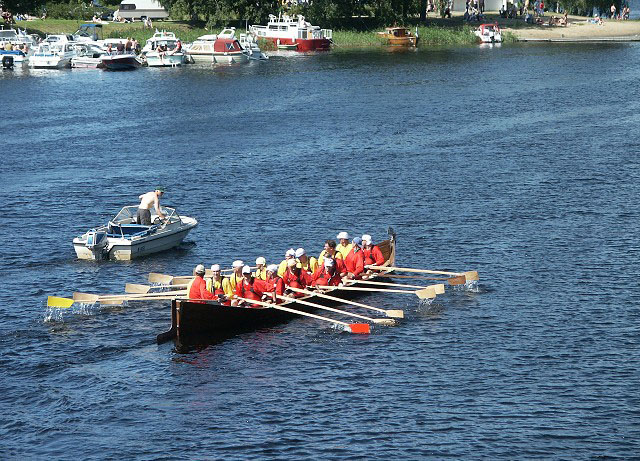
Church boat team during a rowing contest in Sulkava
