= Oravisalo =

Island in Rääkkylä, Finland

Coordinates: 62°21′15″N 029°28′30″E

Oravisalo is an island in Rääkkylä, in Eastern Finland Province, Finland. Oravisalo is also a village in this island that covers an area of 49 km^2. It is 9th biggest freshwater island in Finland. Population is about 250.

== Village ==
- Hernevaara
- Oravisalo
