= Sulkavan Suursoudut =

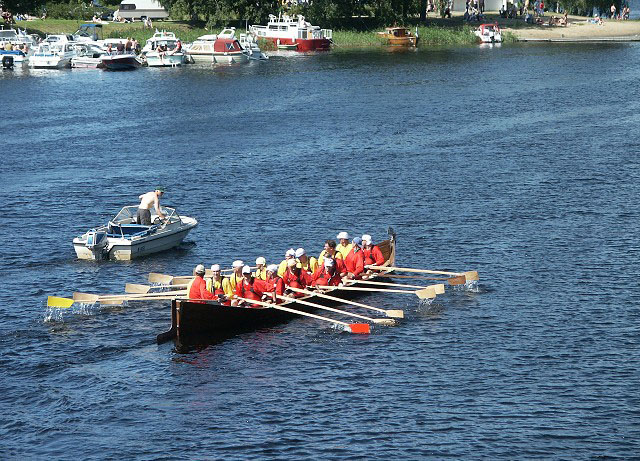
A church boat team during practices for the 35th rowing race in Sulkava in 2002

Sulkavan Suursoudut (English: lit. 'The Grand Rowing Races of Sulkava') is Finland's biggest rowing race, held every July in Sulkava, Southern Savonia, Eastern Finland. It is organised by the Sulkava Association. The 1st race was held in 1968.

== History ==
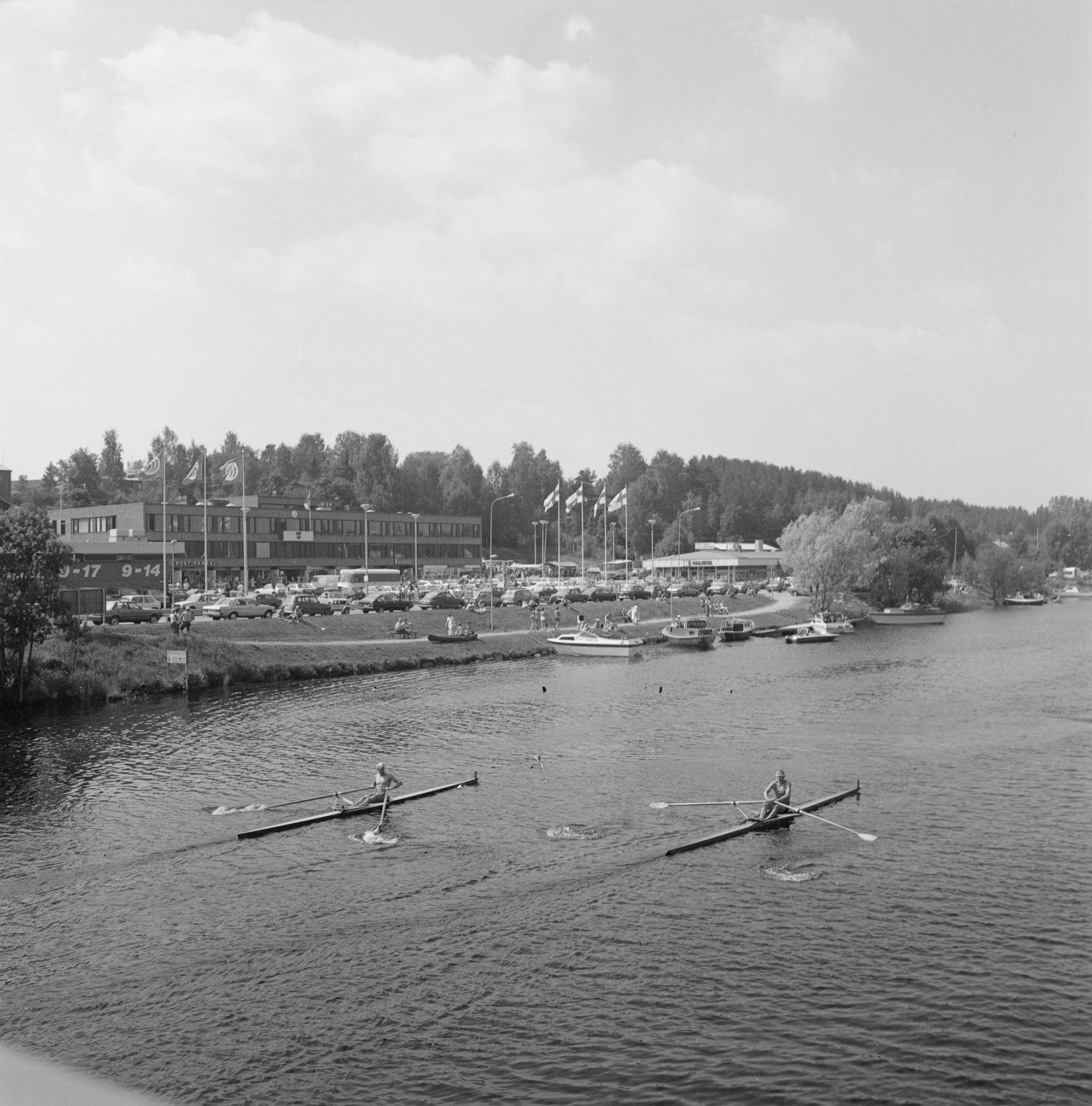
15th race in 1982

The first competition was held in 1968 with 38 competitors. The winner was 67-year-old Einari Luukkonen in a time of 8 hours, 29 minutes, and 40 seconds.

The boats used in competitions are Finnish traditional style wooden rowing boats, normally now made of plywood. Since 1984 there have been competitions in 40 foot 'church-boats', 14 seat craft plus a cox that were traditionally used in church trips. Today the four-day competition involves approximately 8000 rowers with roughly 20,000 people visiting to watch the race. In 2007 the 40th anniversary of the race was held and the four-day competition extended to six days.

The race route is approximately 60 kilometres (37.28 mi). In most years the start is Hakovirta, circling Partalansaari island and finishing at the Sulkava rowing stadium. Current records of the competition are 5.05.50 for men singles, 6.05.53 for women singles; the church boats travel the distance in about 4 hours.

Between 7- and 8,000 competitors and 20,000 spectators take part in Sulkavan Suursoudut every July. The World Masters Rowing Event for church-boats was introduced in 2010, attracting 13 crews from abroad. The competition was held over distances of 2 kilometres (1.24 mi) and 60 kilometres (37.28 mi). The fastest foreign crew over the latter distance was the squad Eco from Russia, finishing in 4 hours and 48 minutes, 45 minutes behind the winning squad, Joutele from Helsinki, Finland.
