= Kyläniemi =

Island in Taipalsaari, Finland

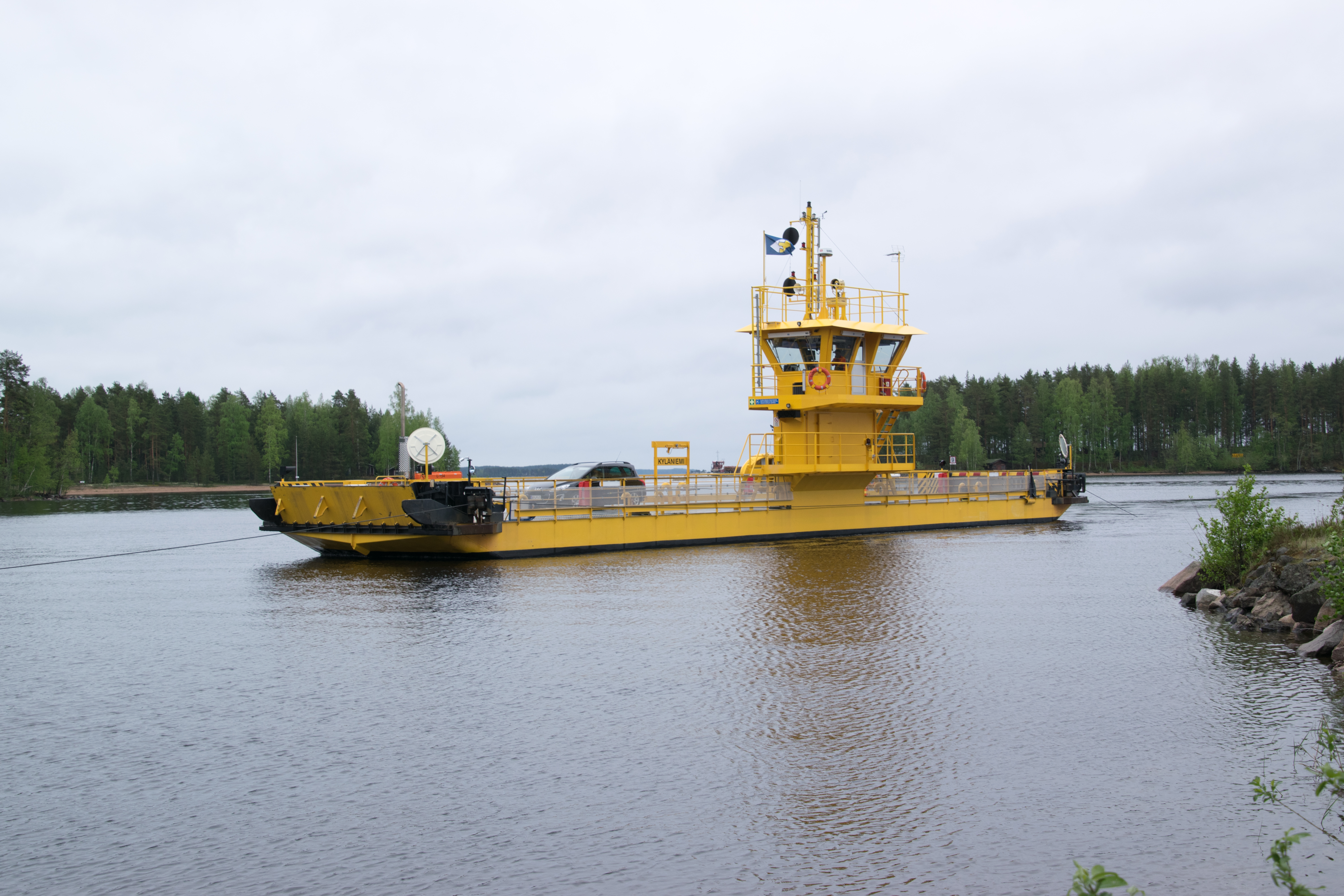
- Kyläniemi ferry
- Interactive map of Kyläniemi

Geography
- Location: Taipalsaari; South Karelia; Finland
- Coordinates: 61°18′22.396″N 28°14′6.587″E
- Adjacent to: Lake Saimaa
- Length: 14 km (8.7 mi)

Kyläniemi is an island on the south of lake Saimaa in Taipalsaari. It was formed during the second Salpausselkä. Kyläniemi is the 20th largest island in Finland's inland waters, with an area of 23 km^{2}.

Kyläniemi used to be a peninsula, until the construction of Kutvele canal in the 18th century turned it into an island. The island can be reached via the road connection at Ruokolahti and via Kyläniemi ferry.

== Geography ==
The 14 km long island consists of sandy beaches, terraces, gravelly deltas and end moraine ridges. Kyläniemi emerged during the second Salpausselkä ice-marginal formation, and pasqueflowers and sand pink flowers were among the first plant species to appear on the island. A variety of plants that can be found includes anemone, sand pansy and canary grass. The island also harbors sparsely wooded coniferous forests.

Kyläniemi is considered a significant geological and biological ridge area. It is protected under the national ridge protection program and the Natura 2000 network of preserved natural sites.

== Gallery ==
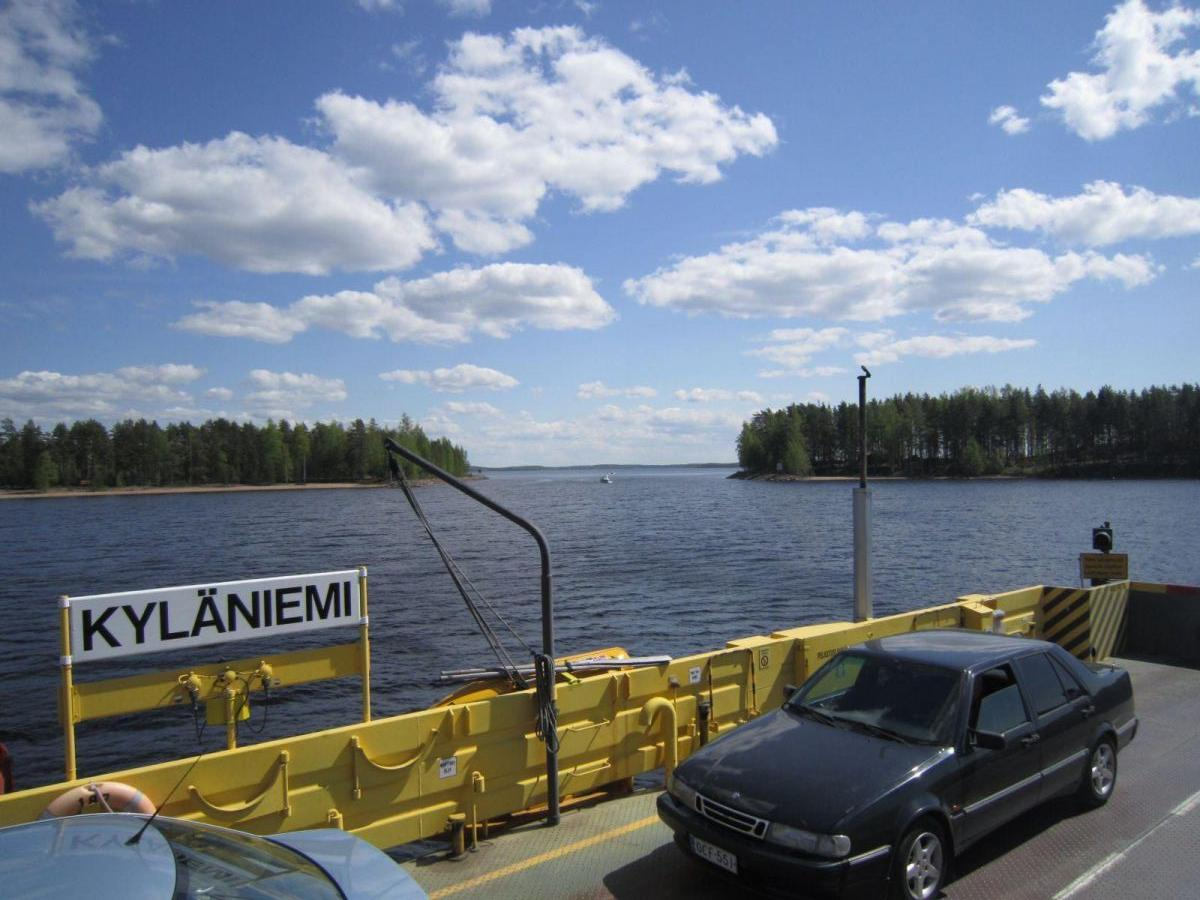
Kyläsalmi cable ferry. Kutvele canal lies in the background.

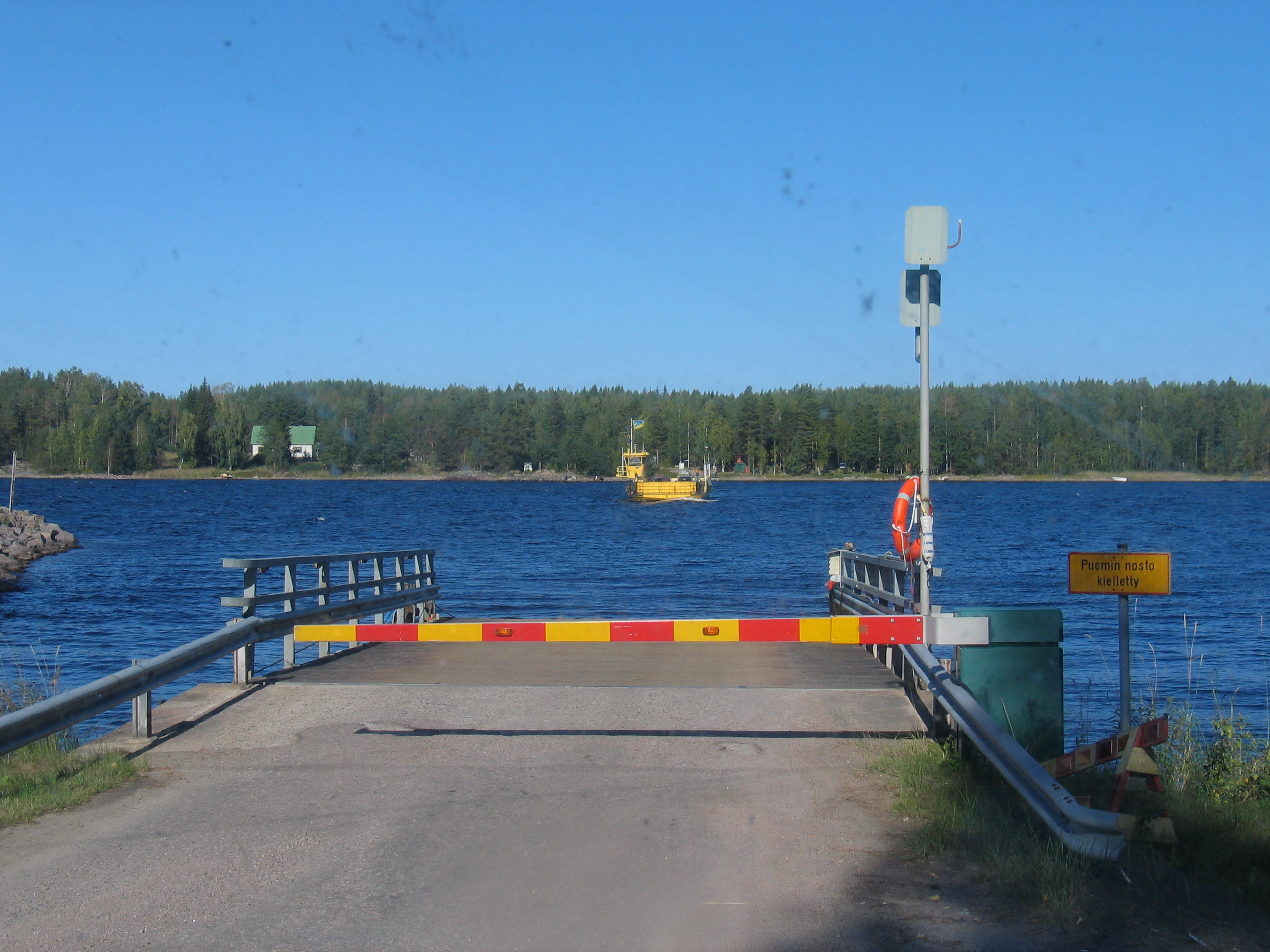
Kyläniemi ferry

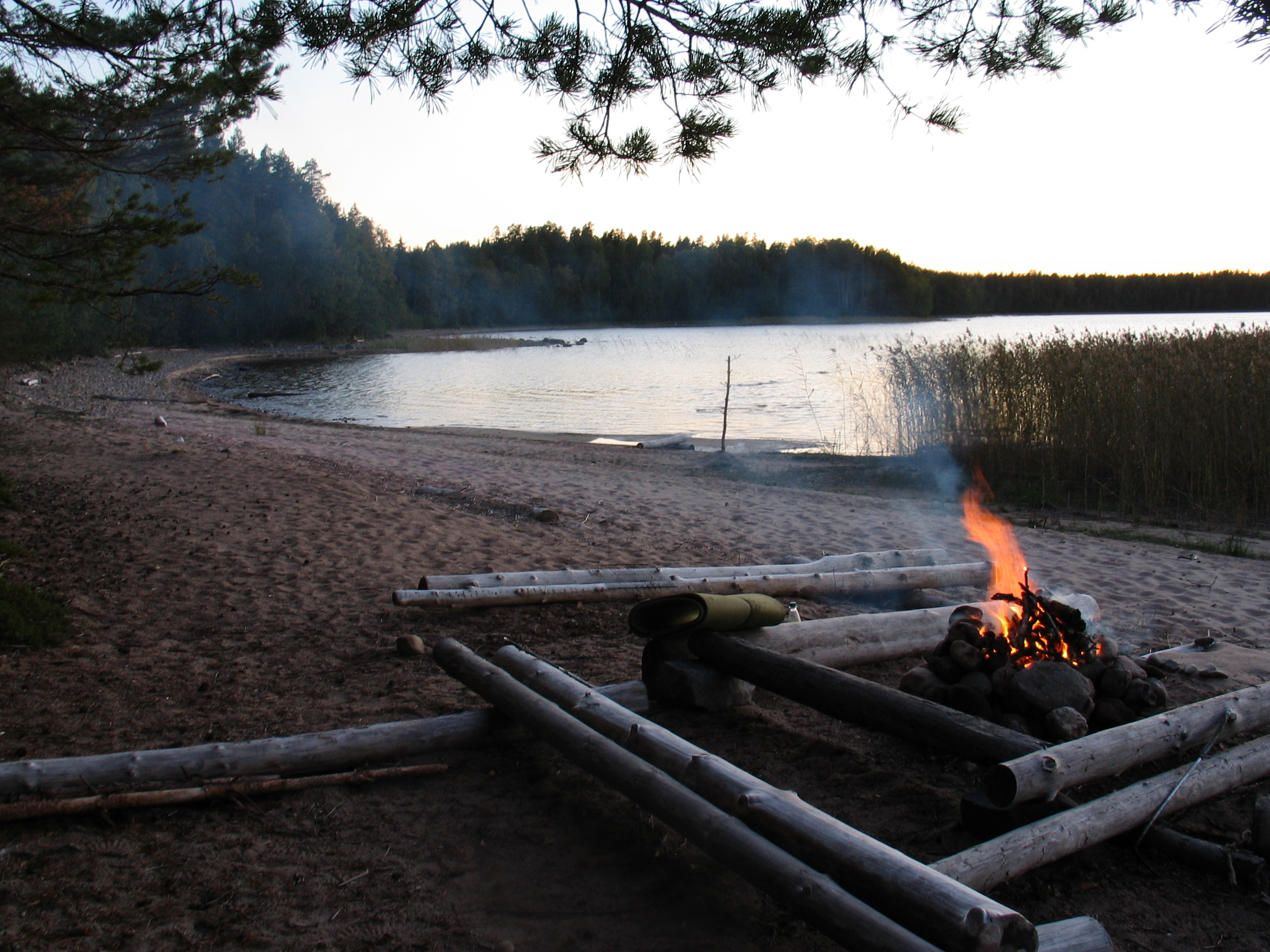
Kyläniemi beach
