= Äitsaari =

Island in Ruokolahti, Finland

Coordinates: 61.30°N 28.63°E

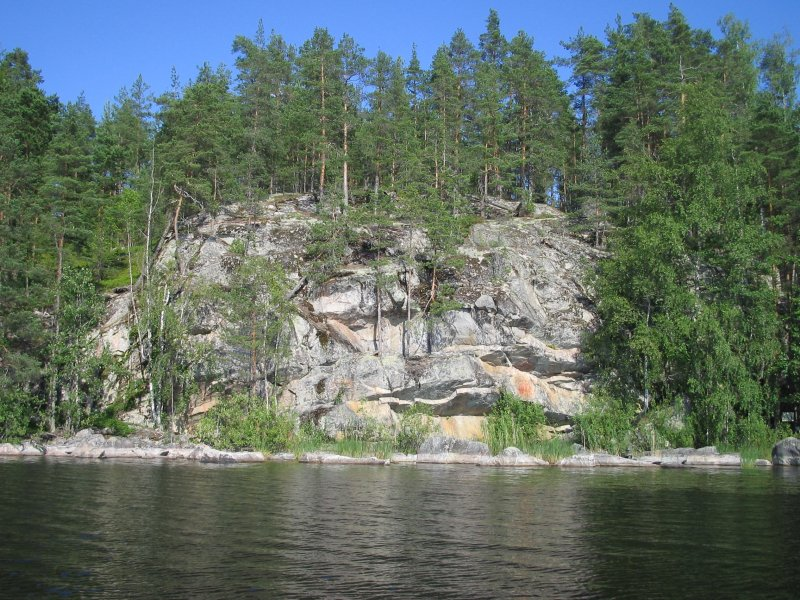
- Kolmiköytisienvuori, as seen southwest of the island

Geography
- Location: Ruokolahti; South Karelia; Finland
- Area: 74 km^{2} (29 sq mi)

Äitsaari (Mother Island) is a large island in Finland. It is situated south of lake Saimaa and is part of the municipality of Ruokolahti. The island is located in the center of Ruokolahti and west of Rasila. It is the largest island in South Karelia and is one of the largest inland islands in Finland, with an area of 74 square kilometers. There is a road connecting the island to the centre of Ruokolahti via Salosaari. There is also a bridge from Äitsaari to the west of Härskiänsaari. Since 1995, the Karhusalmi ferry has been operating from the island to southwest of Mietinsaari.

In the southwest part of Äitsaari, on the shores of Riislahti, lies Kolmiköytisienvuori. A rock painting from the Neolithic Stone Age is found there.

There are twelve villages in Äitsaari: Savilahti, Vilkonmäki, Sopala, Kurjala, Terävälä, Soinila, Aisaniemi, Hännilä, Savolaisenniemi, Hannikylä, Lempiälä and Ravali.

There are several lakes in Äitsaari, the largest of which is Oininki.

Kimmo Tiilikainen, former Minister of Housing, Energy and the Environment of the Sipilä Cabinet, is from Äitsaari.

== Gallery ==
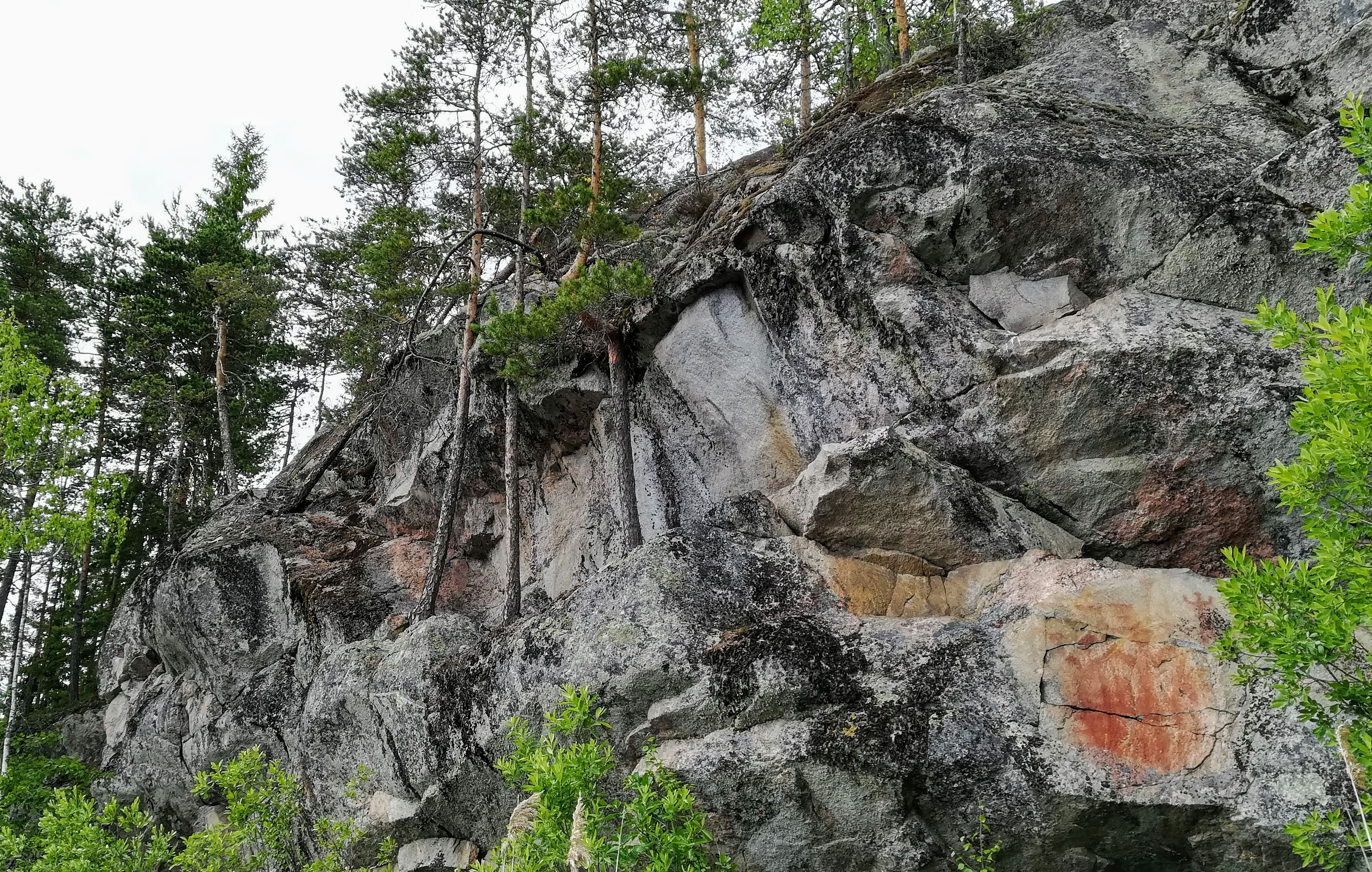
Close-up of Kolmiköytisienvuori, with the Neolithic rock painting

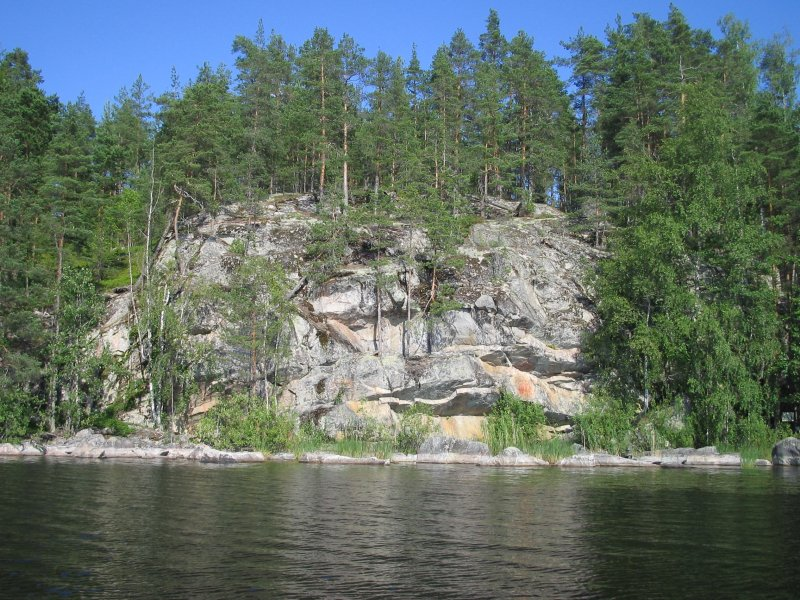
Kolmiköytisienvuori
